= List of rock formations in the United States =

The following is a partial list of rock formations in the United States, organized by state.

== Arizona ==
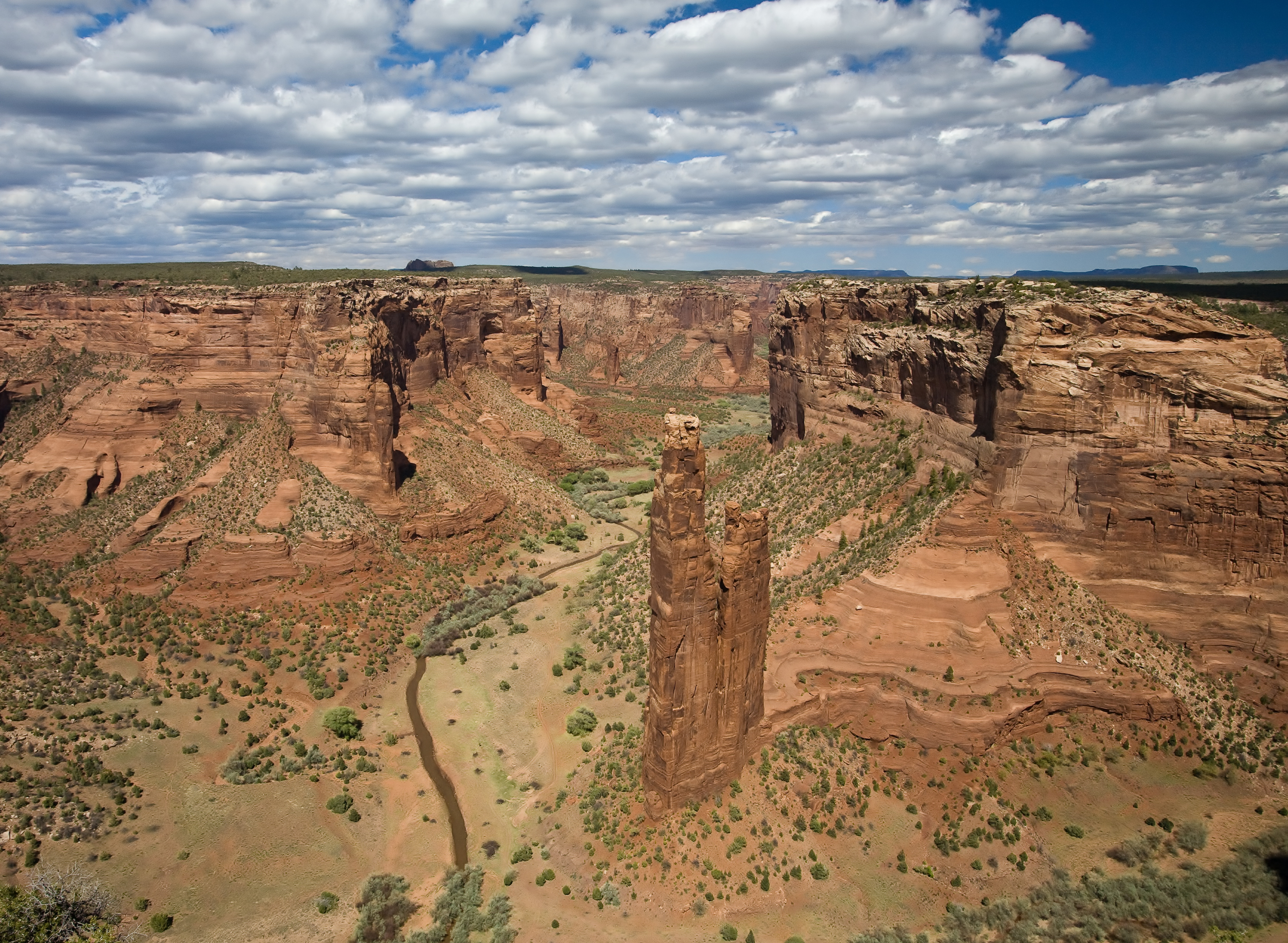
Spider Rock

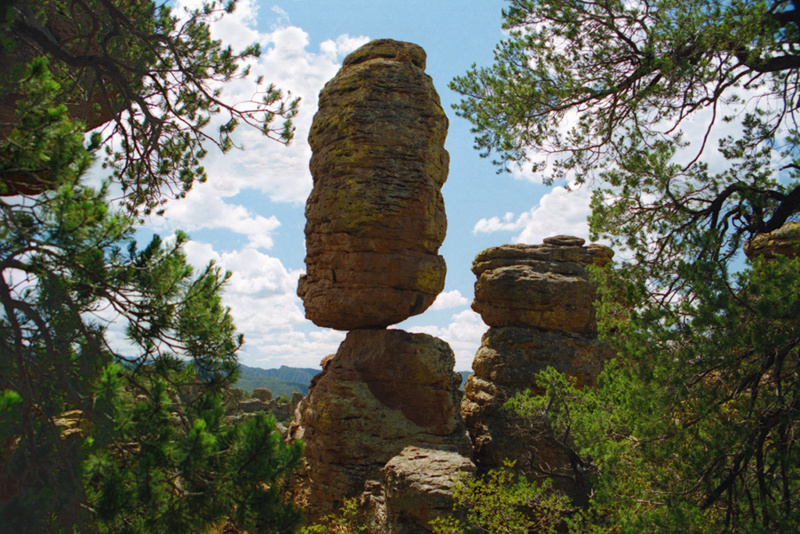
Pinnacle Balanced Rock

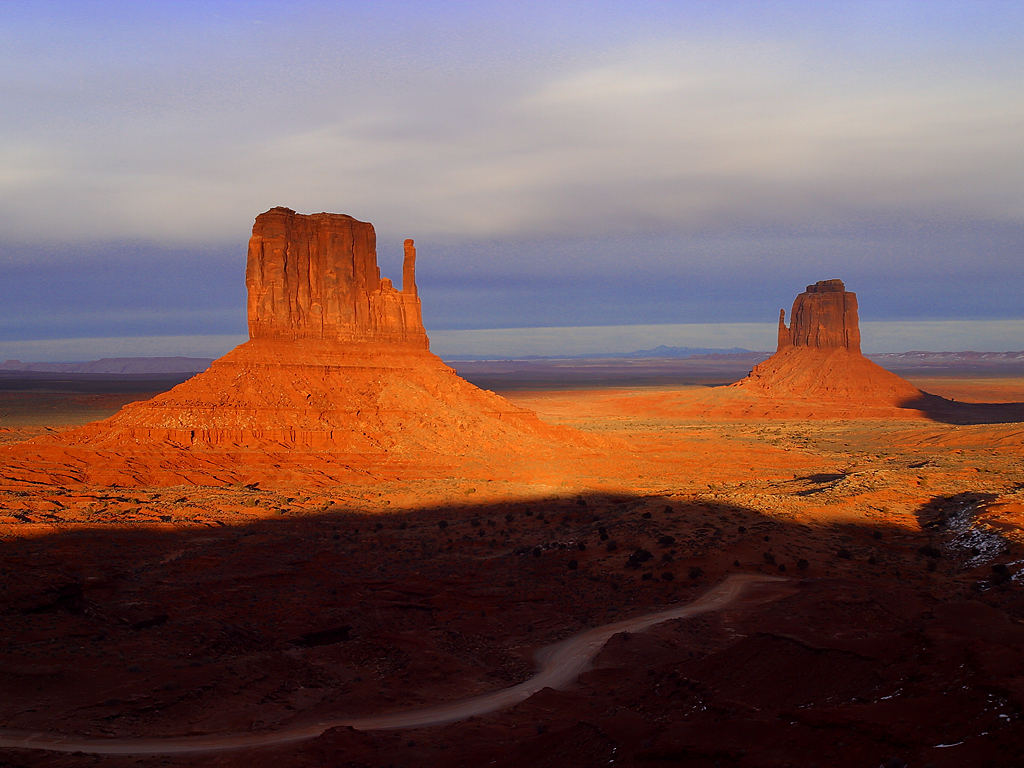
The West and East Mitten Buttes

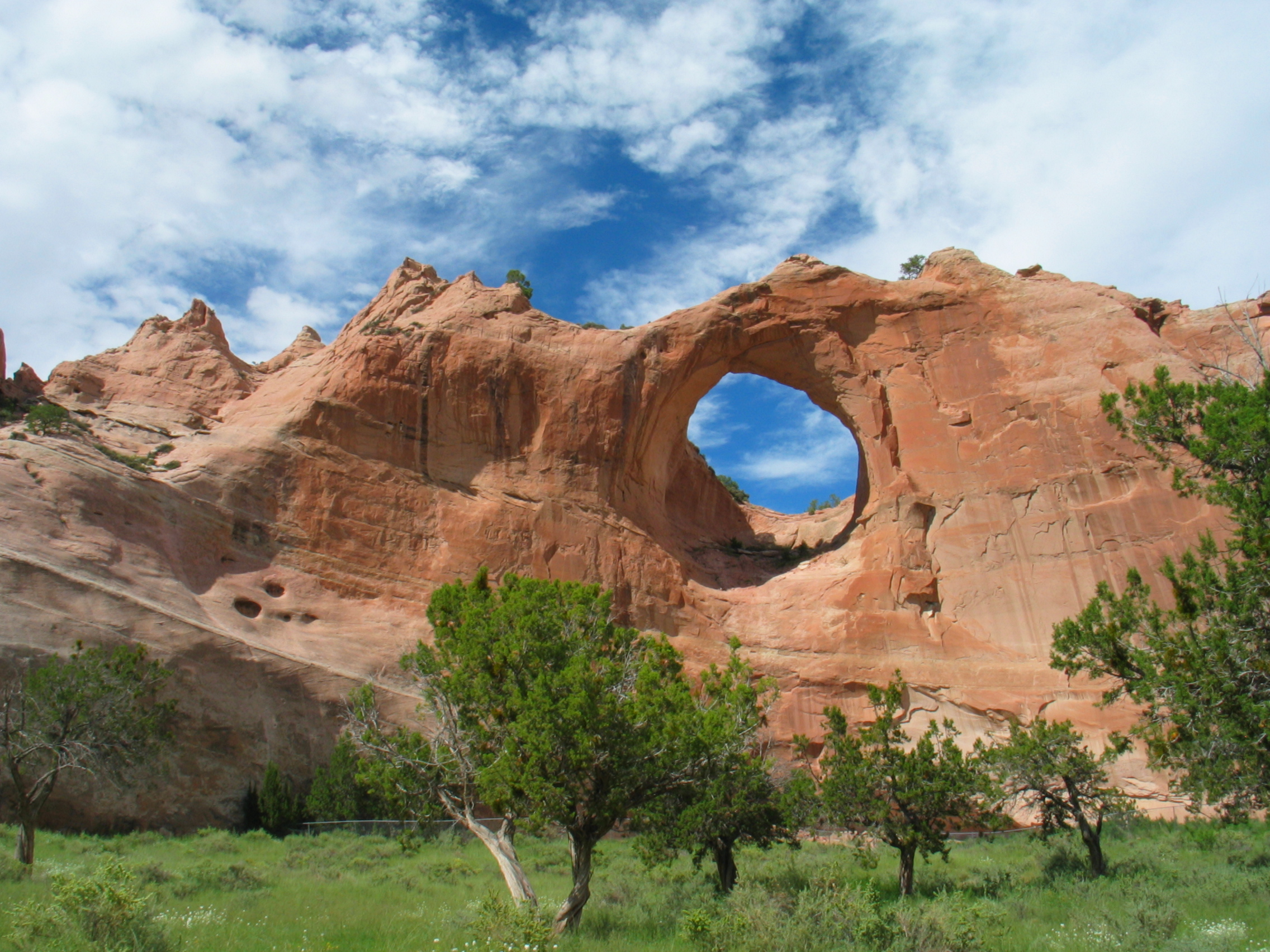
Window Rock

- Agathla Peak
- Antelope Canyon
- Canyon de Chelly National Monument
  - Spider Rock
- Capitol Butte
- Cathedral Rock, Red Rock State Park, Sedona
- Cathedral Rock (Coconino County, Arizona)
- Chaistla Butte
- Chiricahua National Monument
  - Big Balanced Rock
  - Duck on a Rock
  - Mushroom Rock
  - Natural Bridge
  - Organ Pipe
  - Pinnacle Balanced Rock
  - Punch and Judy
  - Sea Captain
- Church Rock
- Comb Ridge
- Coyote Buttes
  - The Wave
- Elephants Tooth
- Grand Canyon
  - Angels Gate
  - Angels Window
  - Apollo Temple
  - Brahma Temple
  - Buddha Temple
  - Cheops Pyramid
  - Chuar Butte
  - Coronado Butte
  - Deva Temple
  - Dox Castle
  - Explorers Monument
  - Gunther Castle
  - Holy Grail Temple
  - Horseshoe Mesa
  - Manu Temple
  - Marsh Butte
  - Mount Hayden
  - Mount Sinyella
  - O'Neill Butte
  - Shiva Temple
  - Sinking Ship
  - Tower of Ra
  - Tower of Set
  - Vishnu Temple
  - Wotans Throne
  - Zoroaster Temple
  - Numerous other named buttes, mesas, and "temples"
- Hole-in-the-Rock, Papago Park, Phoenix
- LeChee Rock
- Monument Valley
  - Camel Butte
  - Cly Butte
  - Elephant Butte
  - Gray Whiskers
  - Hunts Mesa
  - Merrick Butte
  - Mitchell Butte
  - The Mitten Buttes
  - North Window
  - Rain God Mesa
  - Rooster Rock
  - Spearhead Mesa
  - Three Sisters
  - The Thumb
  - Thunderbird Mesa
  - Totem Pole
- Owl Rock
- Petrified Forest National Park
  - Agate Bridge
- Phallic Rock
- Round Rock
- Square Butte
- Tonto Natural Bridge
- Tower Butte
- Two Nuns
- Weaver Needle, Superstition Mountains
- Window Rock

== California ==
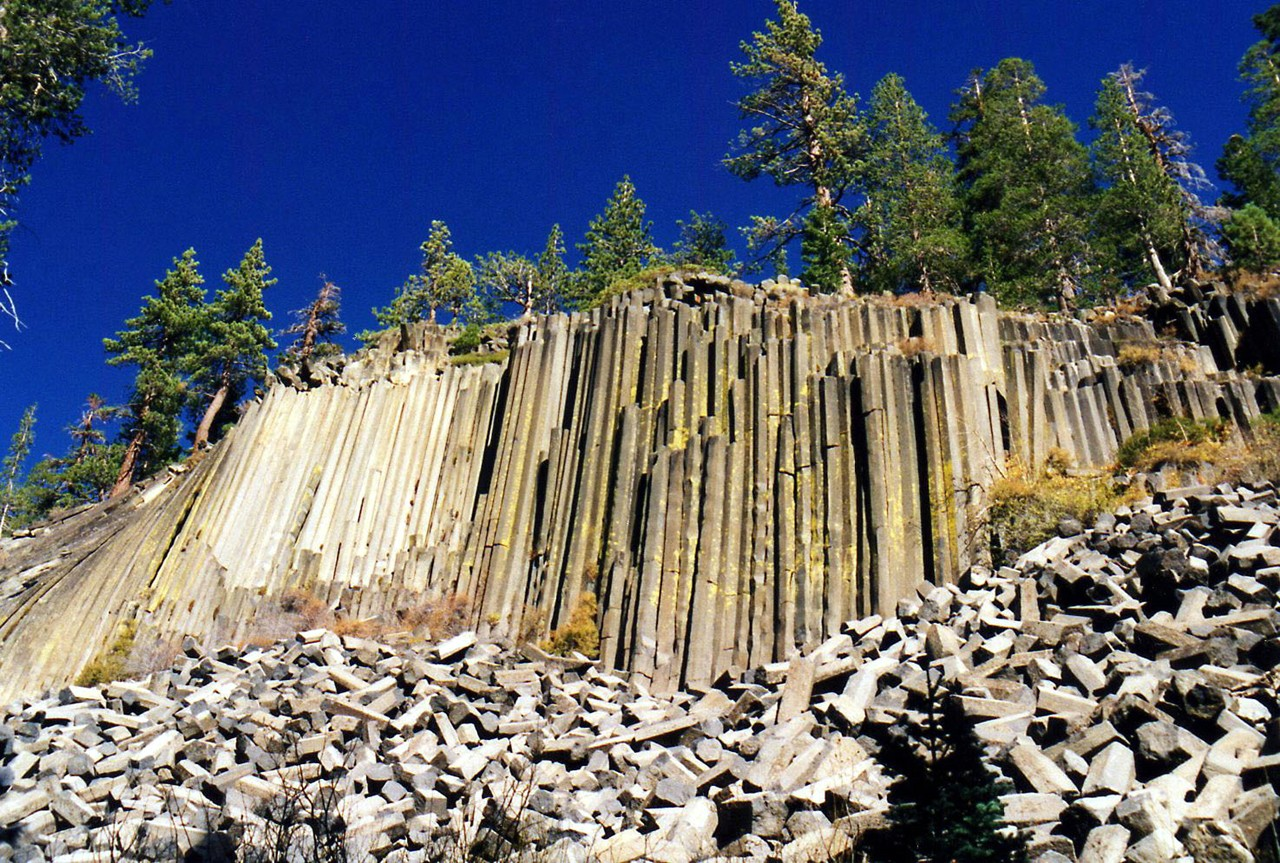
Devils Postpile

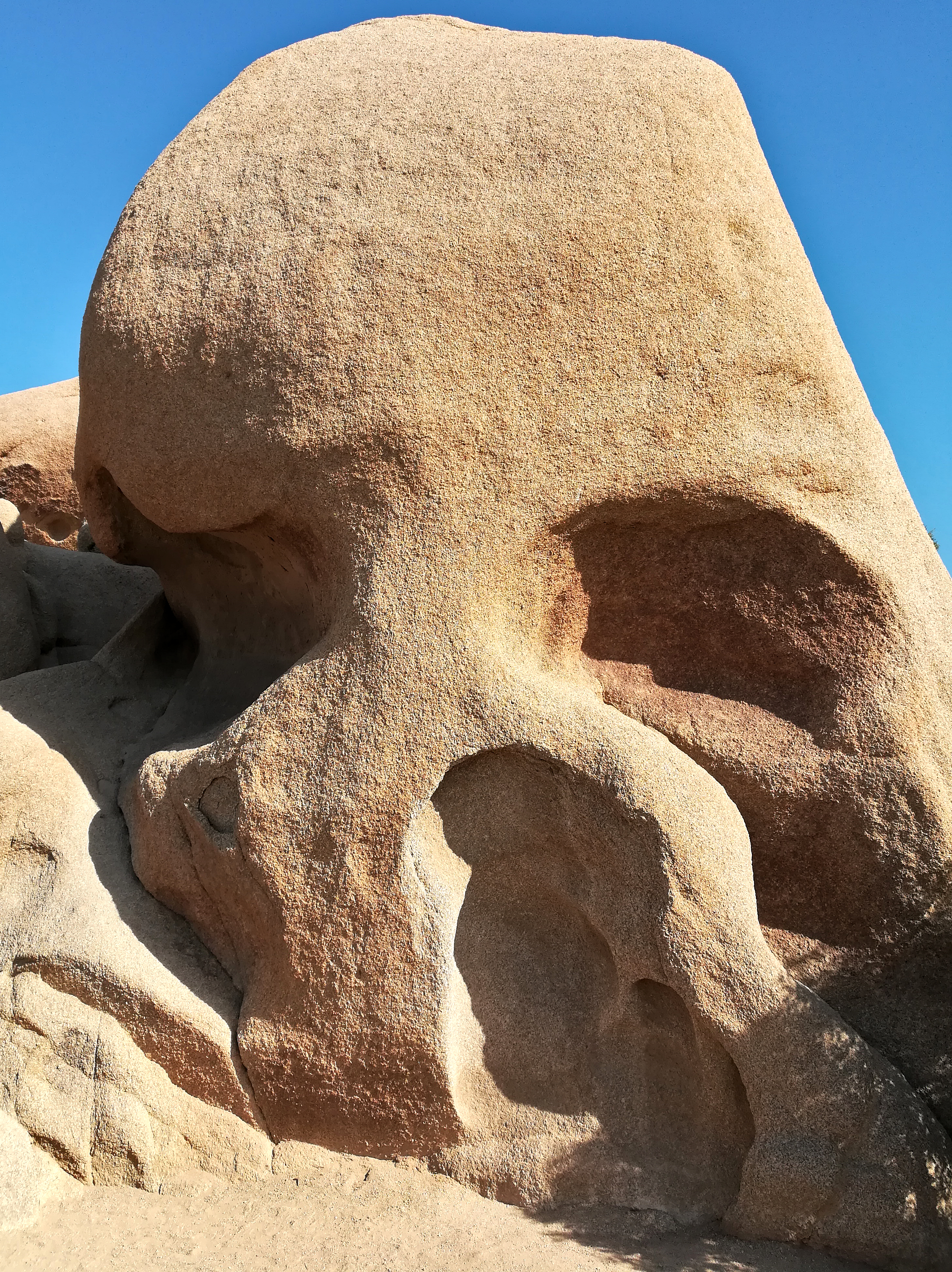
Skull Rock

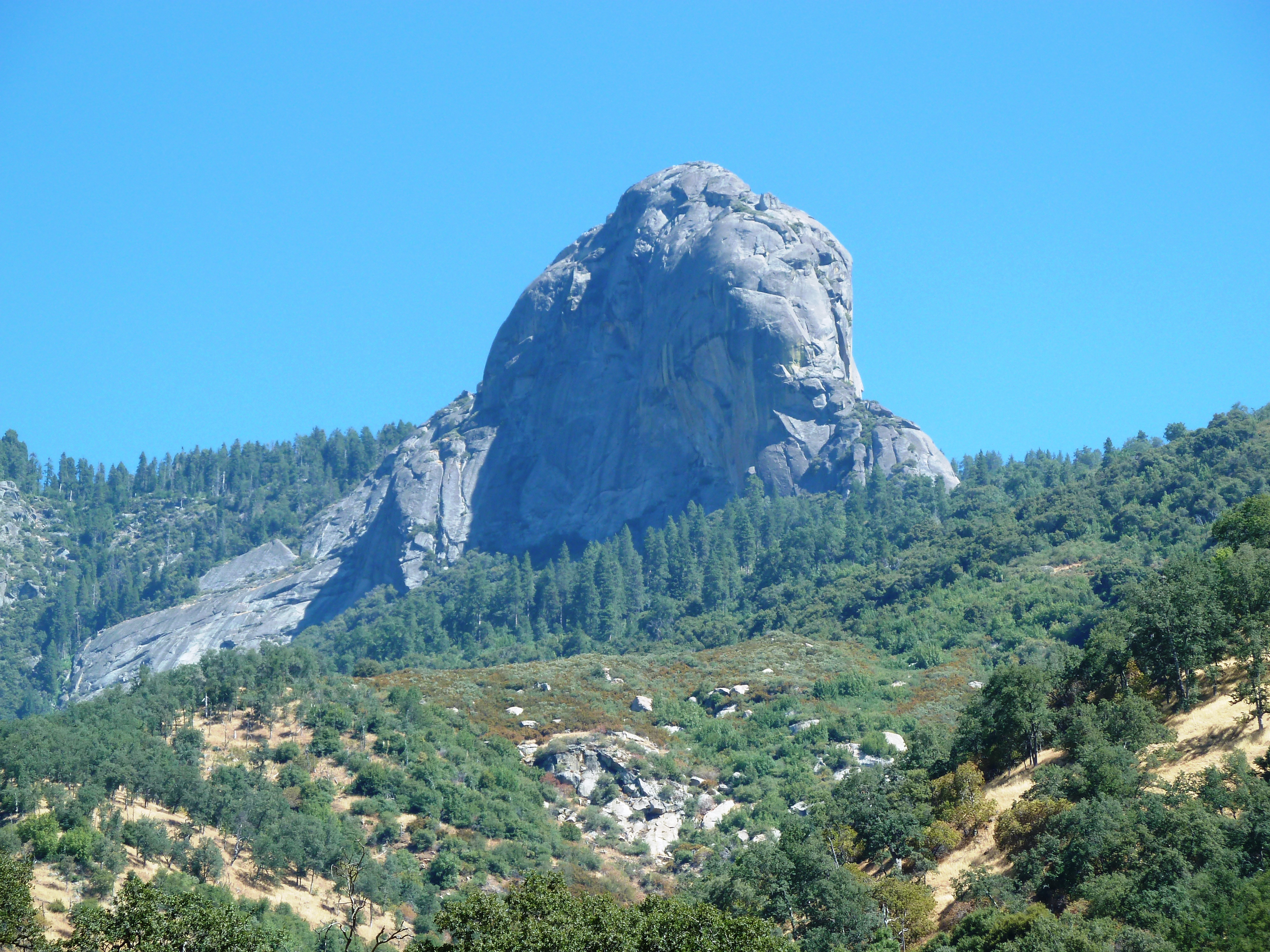
Moro Rock

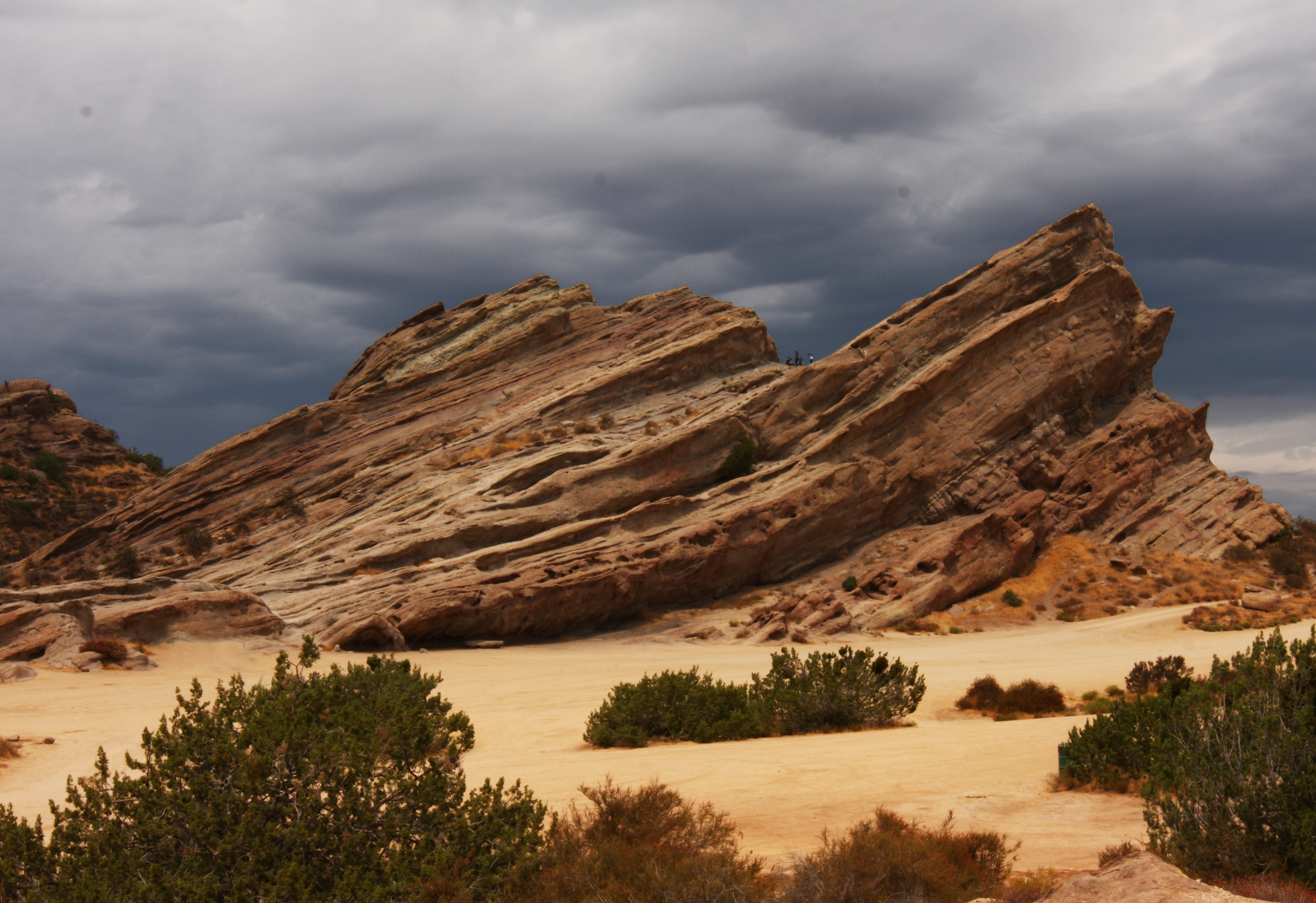
Vasquez Rocks

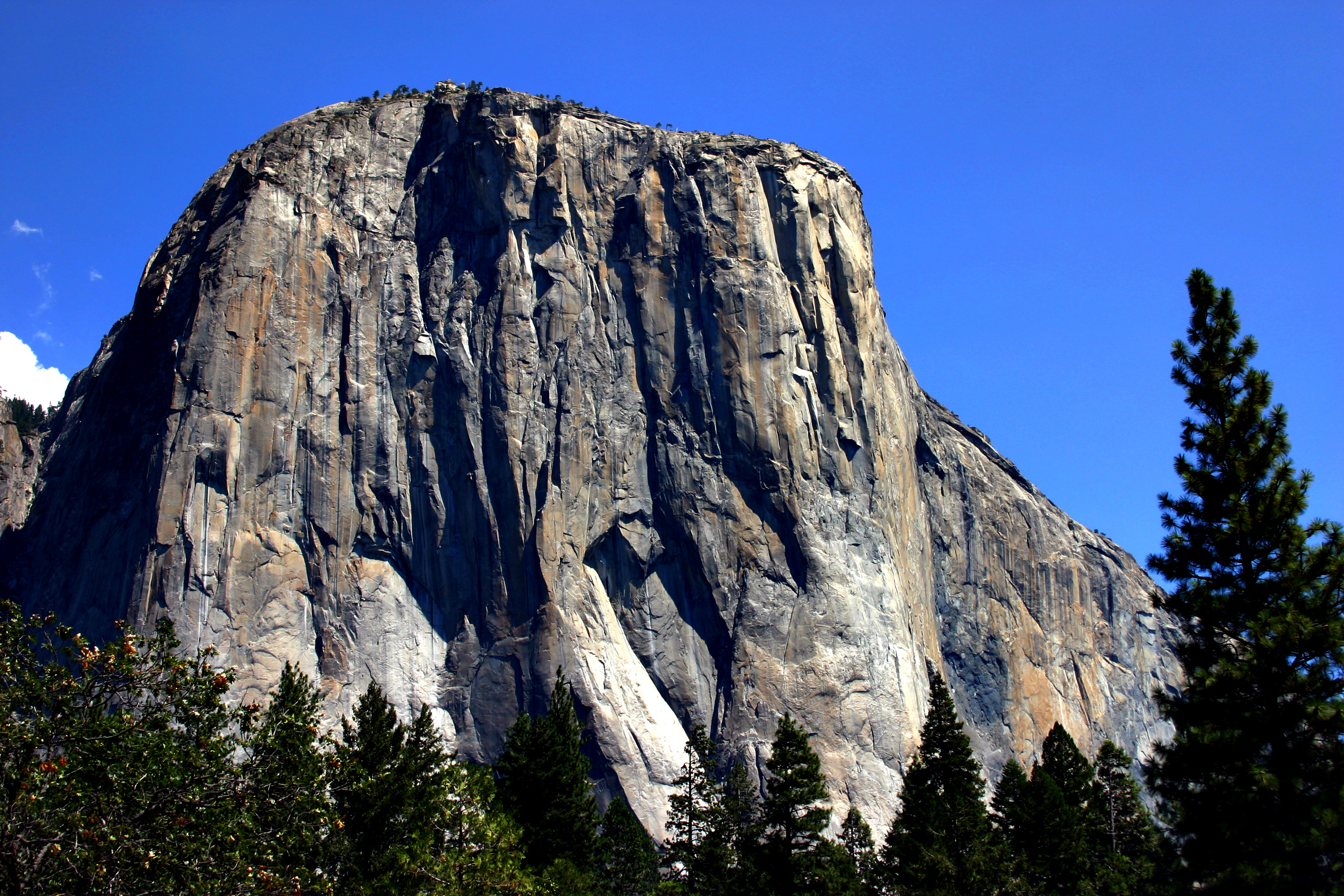
El Capitan

- Alabama Hills
  - Mobius Arch
  - Shark Fin
- Bald Rock Dome
- Bird Rock
- Buttermilk Country
- Calaveras Dome
- Castle Crags
- Castro Rocks
- Charlotte Dome, Kings Canyon National Park
- Death Valley National Park
  - The Grandstand
  - Manly Beacon
  - Zabriskie Point
- Devils Postpile
- Eagle Rock, Los Angeles
- Eagle Rock, Pacific Crest Trail
- Elephants Playground
- Frog Woman Rock
- Giant Rock
- Goat Buttes
- Gull Rock
- Indian Rock, Indian Rock Park
- Joshua Tree National Park
  - Skull Rock
- Lover's Leap
- Mono Lake Tufa State Natural Reserve
- Moro Rock, Sequoia National Park
- Morro Rock
- Mussel Rock
- Nine Sisters (aka "The Morros"), San Luis Obispo
- Pinnacles National Park
- Potato Chip Rock
- Rainbow Basin
- Red Rock Canyon
- Robbers Roost
- San Pedro Rock
- Santee Boulders
- Scotia Bluffs
- Seal Rocks (San Francisco, California)
- Seal Rock (San Mateo County, California)
- Sears Rock
- Stoney Point
- Suicide Rock
- Sutter Buttes
- Tahquitz Rock
- Trona Pinnacles
- Vasquez Rocks
- Yosemite National Park
  - Cathedral Rocks
  - Clouds Rest
  - El Capitan
  - Glacier Point
  - Half Dome
  - Kolana Rock
  - Leaning Tower
  - Lembert Dome
  - Little Devils Postpile
  - Lost Arrow Spire
  - Royal Arches
  - Sentinel Rock
  - Three Brothers

== Colorado ==
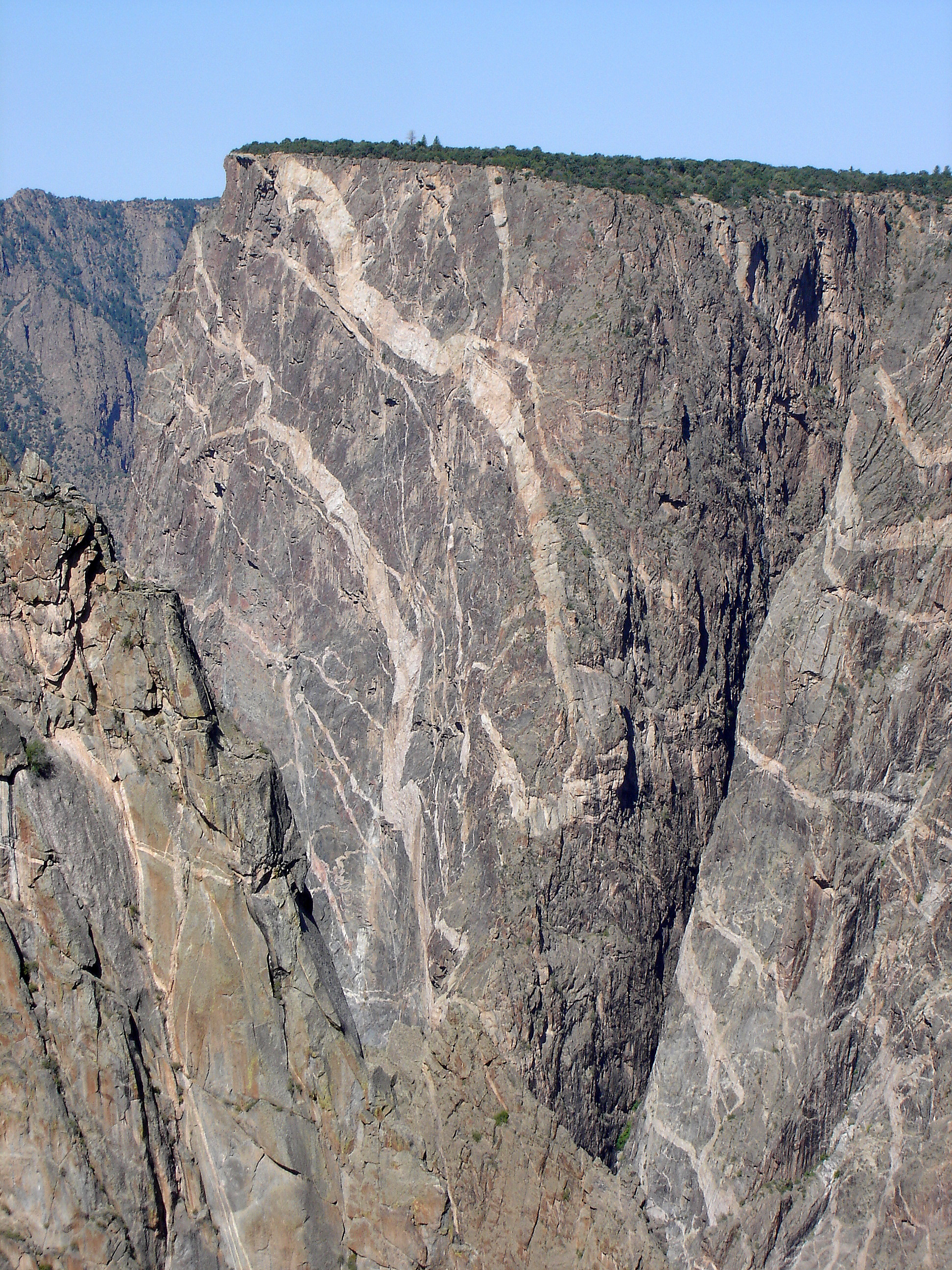
Painted Wall

- Castle Rock
- Chimney Rock
- Chimney Rock (Jackson Butte)
- Colorado National Monument
  - Coke Ovens
  - Devils Kitchen
  - Grand View Spire
  - Independence Monument
  - Kissing Couple
  - Pipe Organ
  - Sentinel Spire
  - Terra Tower
  - Window Rock
- Curecanti Needle
- Garden of the Gods
- Lizard Head
- Painted Wall, Black Canyon of the Gunnison National Park
- Petit Grepon, Rocky Mountain National Park
- Point Lookout, Mesa Verde National Park
- Red Rocks Amphitheatre
- Steamboat Rock
- Wheeler Geologic Area

== Connecticut ==
- West Rock

== Georgia ==
- Broxton Rocks
- Rock City, Lookout Mountain
- Stone Mountain

== Hawaii ==
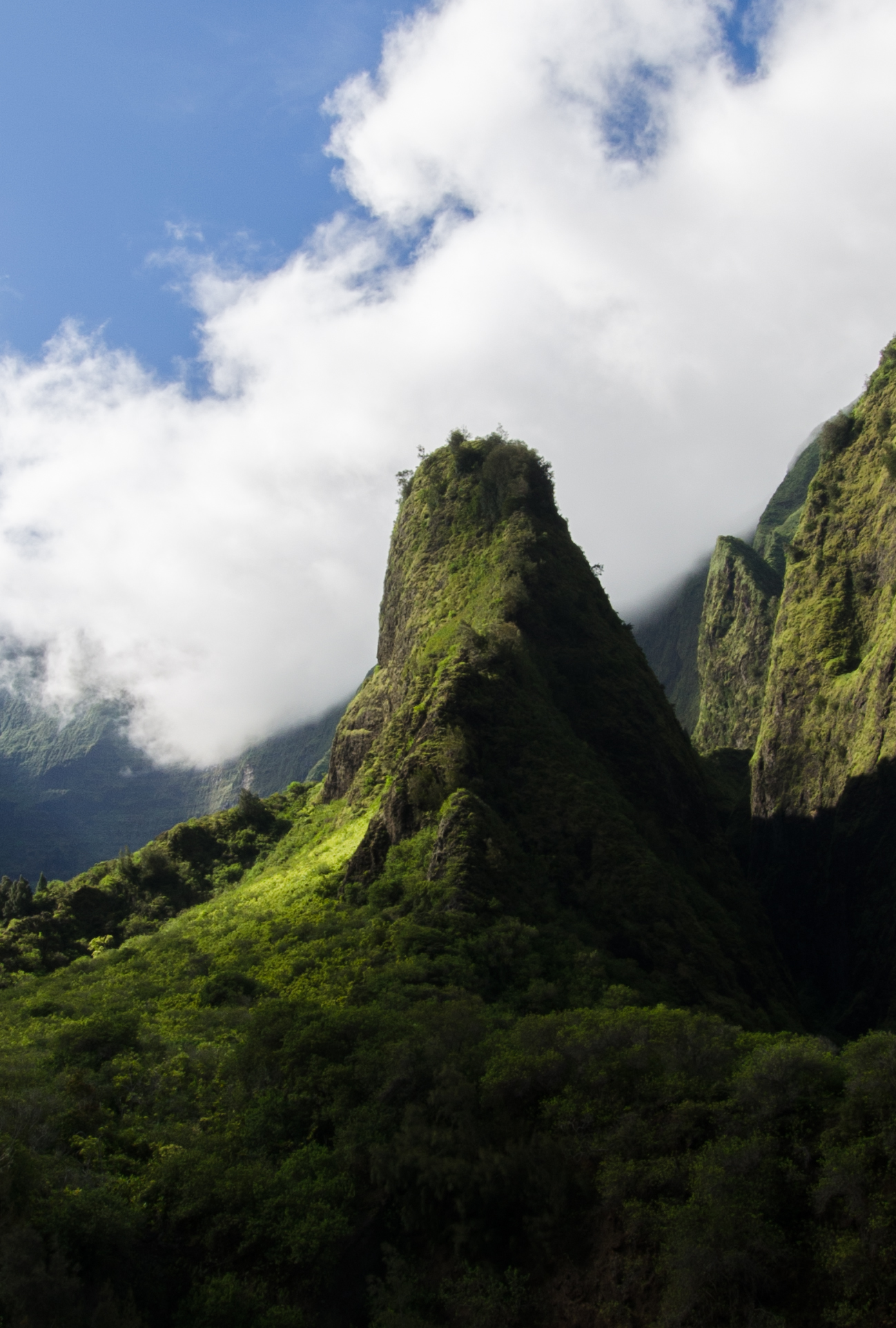
ʻĪao Needle

- ʻĪao Needle, Maui
- Gardner Pinnacles, Northwestern Hawaiian Islands

== Idaho ==
- City of Rocks National Reserve
- Craters of the Moon National Monument and Preserve
- Finger of Fate

== Illinois ==
- Garden of the Gods, Shawnee National Forest

== Indiana ==
- Devil's Backbone, near Charlestown
- Hanging Rock, near Lagro
- Jug Rock, near Shoals
- Portland Arch, near Fountain

== Iowa ==
- Gitchie Manitou State Preserve, Granite, Lyon County

== Kansas ==
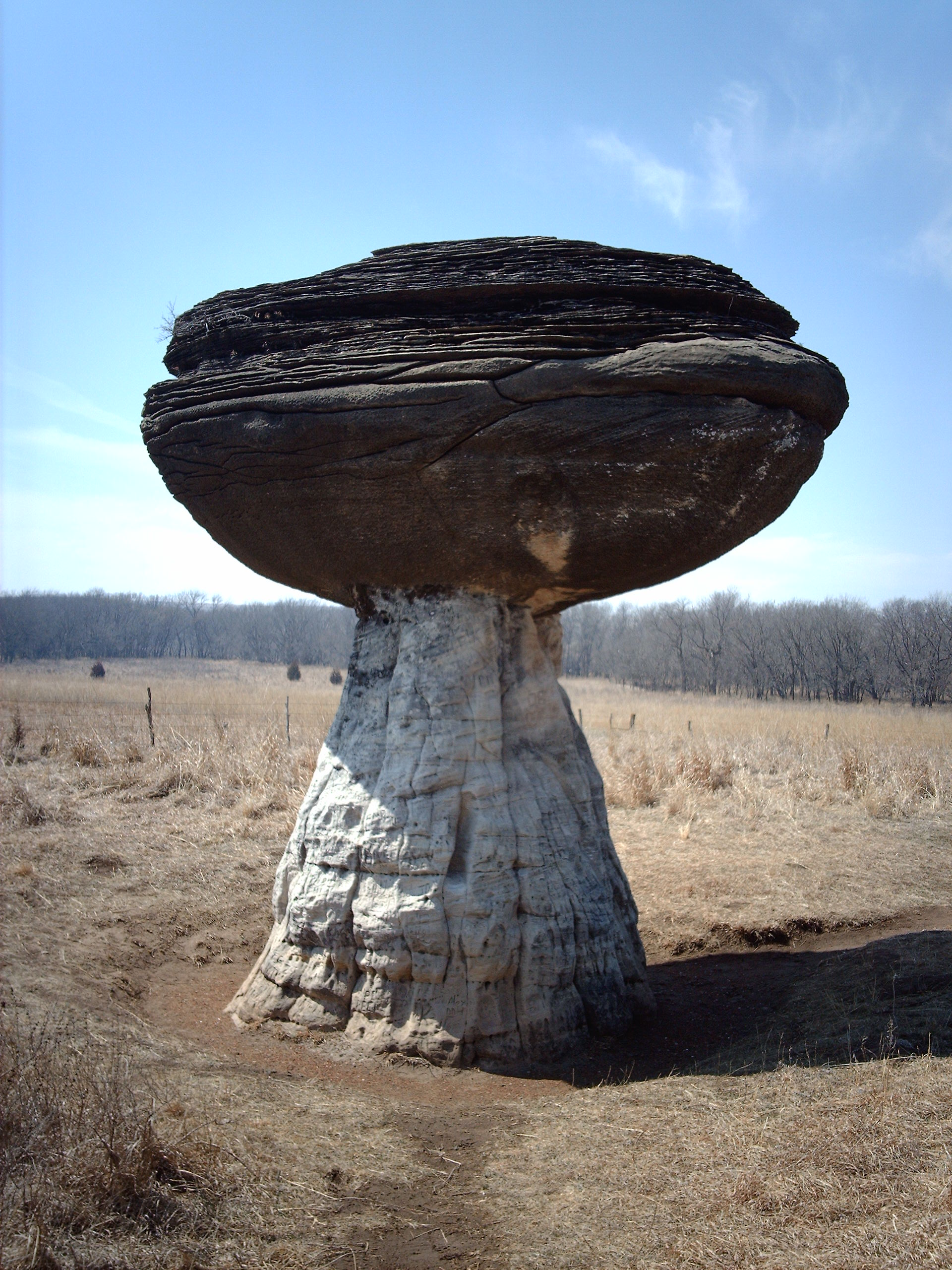
Mushroom Rock

- Castle Rock, Quinter
- Monument Rocks, Oakley
- Mushroom Rock State Park, Carneiro
- Rock City, Minneapolis

== Kentucky ==
- Mantle Rock, Livingston County
- Natural Bridge
- Red River Gorge
  - Raven Rock

== Massachusetts ==
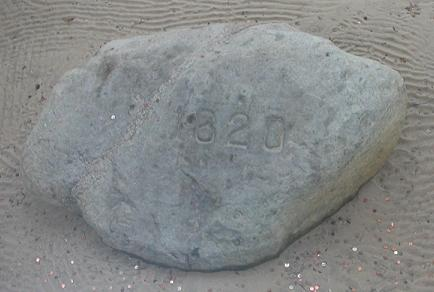
Plymouth Rock

- Farley Ledges
- Mother Ann
- Plymouth Rock
- Profile Rock
- Redemption Rock

== Michigan ==
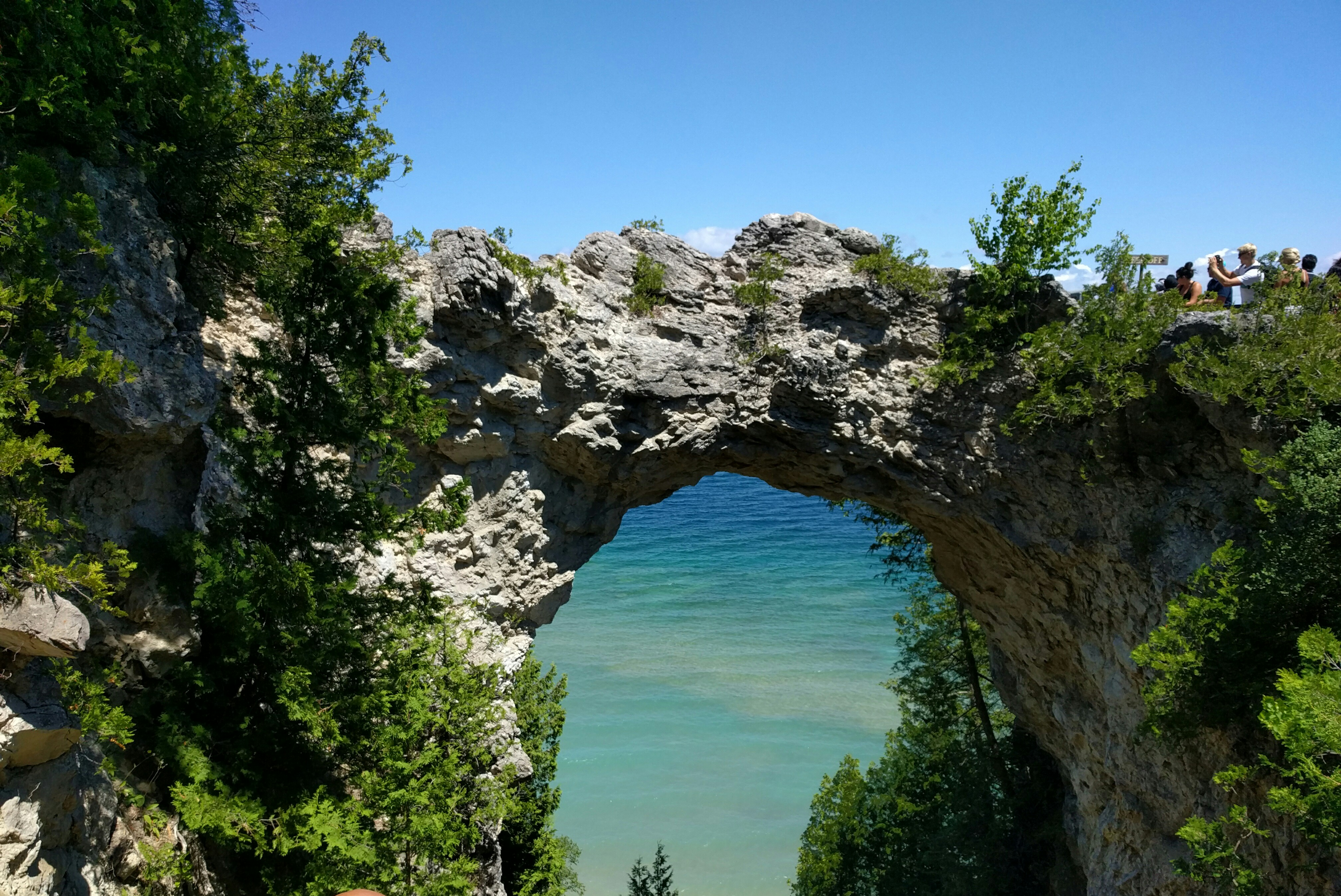
- Arch Rock
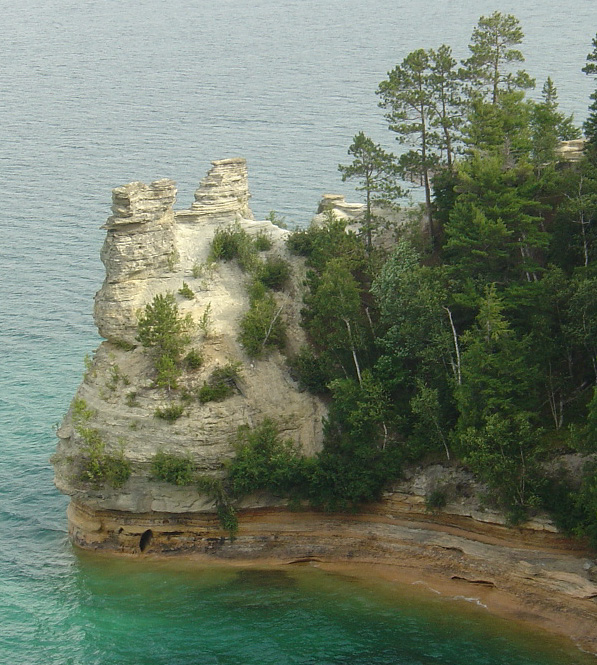
  Miner's Castle
  Arch Rock (Mackinac County)
- Big Rock (Montmorency County)
- Brockway Mountain (Keweenaw County)
- Castle Rock (Mackinac County)
- Chapel Rock (Alger County)
- Chapel Cove (Alger County)
- Devil's Kitchen (Mackinac County)
- Grand Portal Point (Alger County)
- Hendrie River Water Cave (Mackinac County)
- Huron Mountains (Baraga & (Marquette Counties)
- Isle Royale (Keweenaw County)
- Lake Michigan Stonehenge (Grand Traverse County)
- Lake of the Clouds (Ontonagon County)
- Lovers' Leap (Alger County)
- Miner's Castle (Alger County)
- Presque Isle & Little Presque Isle (Marquette County)
- Skull Cave (Mackinac County)
- Tahquamenon Falls (Chippewa & Luce Counties)
- Turnip Rock (Huron County)
- The Thumbnail (Huron County)

== Minnesota ==
- Barn Bluff
- Devil's Kettle, Judge C. R. Magney State Park
- In-Yan-Teopa, Frontenac State Park
- Palisade Head
- Sugar Loaf

== Missouri ==
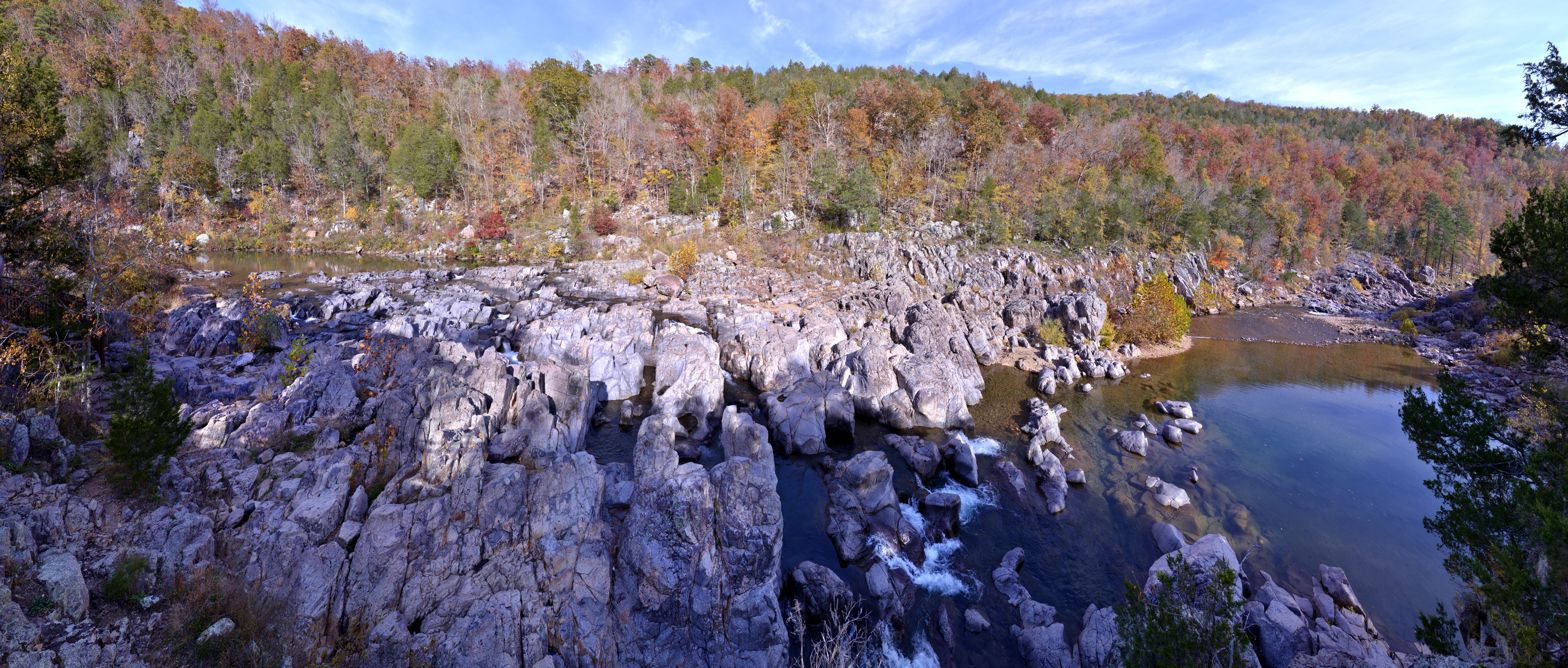
Johnson's Shut-Ins

- Elephant Rocks State Park, Iron County
- Grand Gulf State Park, Oregon County
- Hughes Mountain, Washington County
- Johnson's Shut-Ins State Park, Reynolds County
- Tower Rock, Perry County

== Montana ==
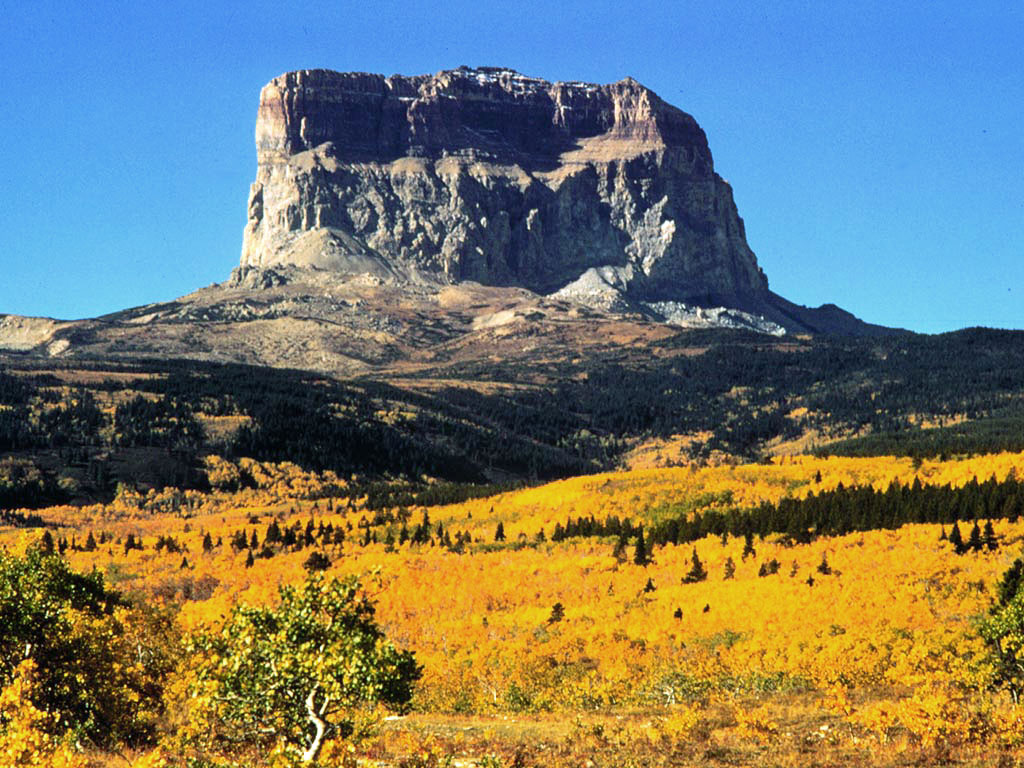
Chief Mountain

- Beaverhead Rock
- Castle Rock Spire
- Chief Mountain, Glacier National Park
- Chinese Wall
- Devil's Slide
- Eye of the Needle (collapsed in 1997)
- LaBarge Rock
- Makoshika State Park
- Medicine Rocks State Park
- Pompeys Pillar
- Pumpelly Pillar

== Nebraska ==
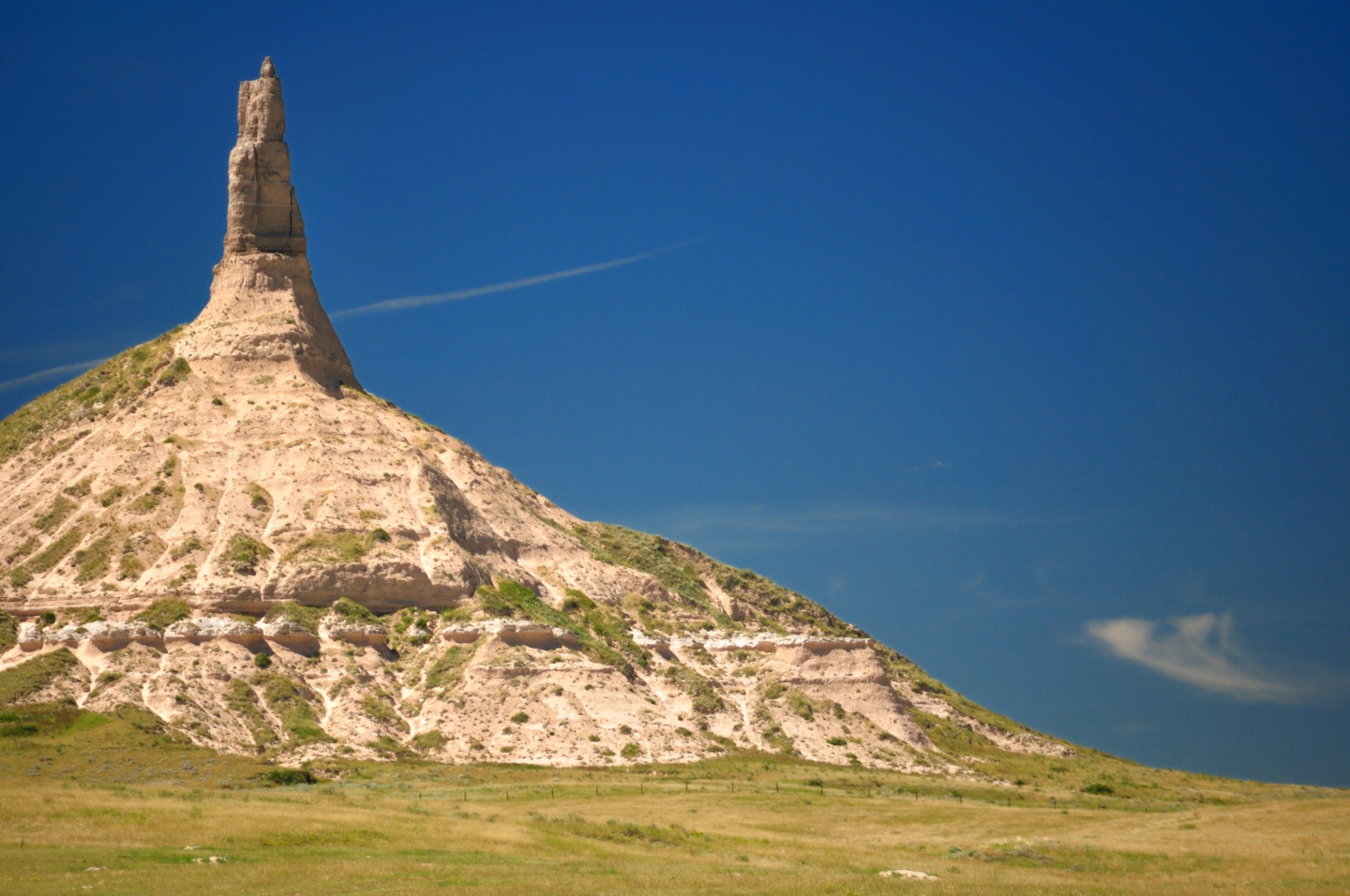
Chimney Rock

- Bead Mountain Formation
- Cheyenne Buttes
- Chimney Rock
- Courthouse and Jail Rocks
- Eagle's Eye Rock
- Flannigan Butte
- Scotts Bluff National Monument
- Smokestack Rock
- Steamboat Butte
- Sugar Loaf Butte
- Toadstool Formation

== Nevada ==
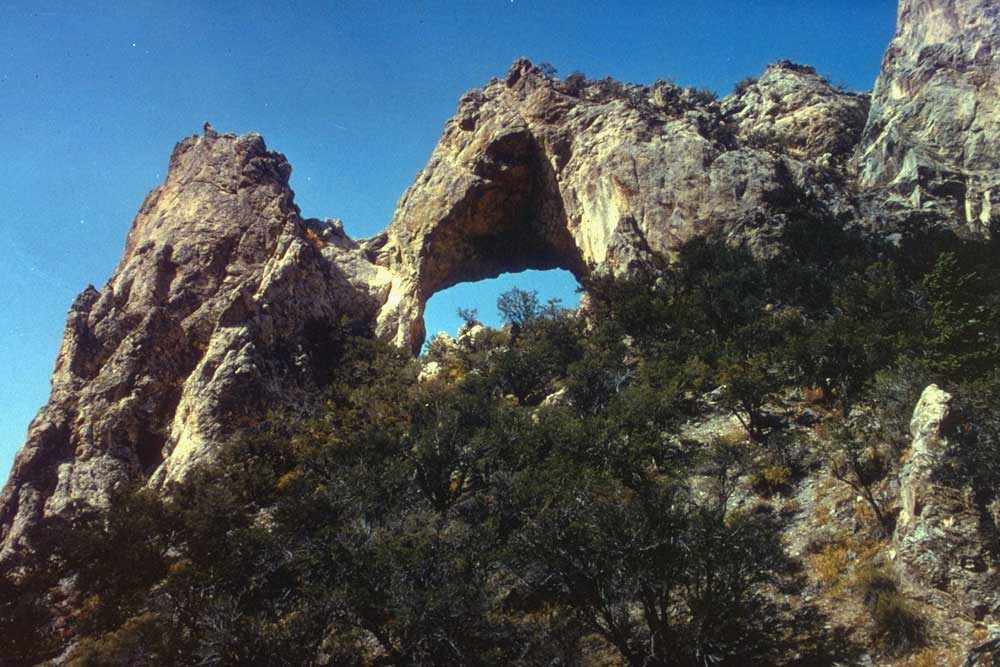
Lexington Arch

- Bridge Mountain's natural arch
- Lexington Arch, Great Basin National Park
- Little Finland, Gold Butte National Monument
- Red Rock Canyon
- Valley of Fire State Park
  - Elephant Rock
  - Fire Wave (similar to but smaller than The Wave in Arizona)
  - Natural Arch (collapsed in 2010)

== New Hampshire ==
- Madison Boulder
- Old Man of the Mountain (collapsed in 2003)

== New Jersey ==
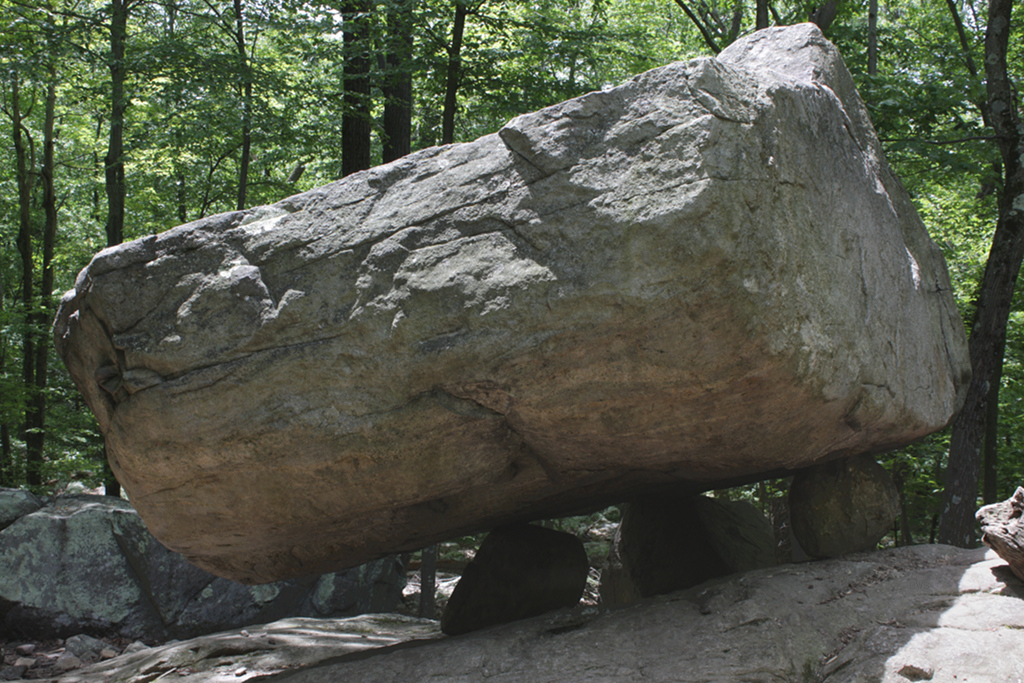
Tripod Rock (video)

- Delaware Water Gap
- The Palisades
- Tripod Rock

== New Mexico ==
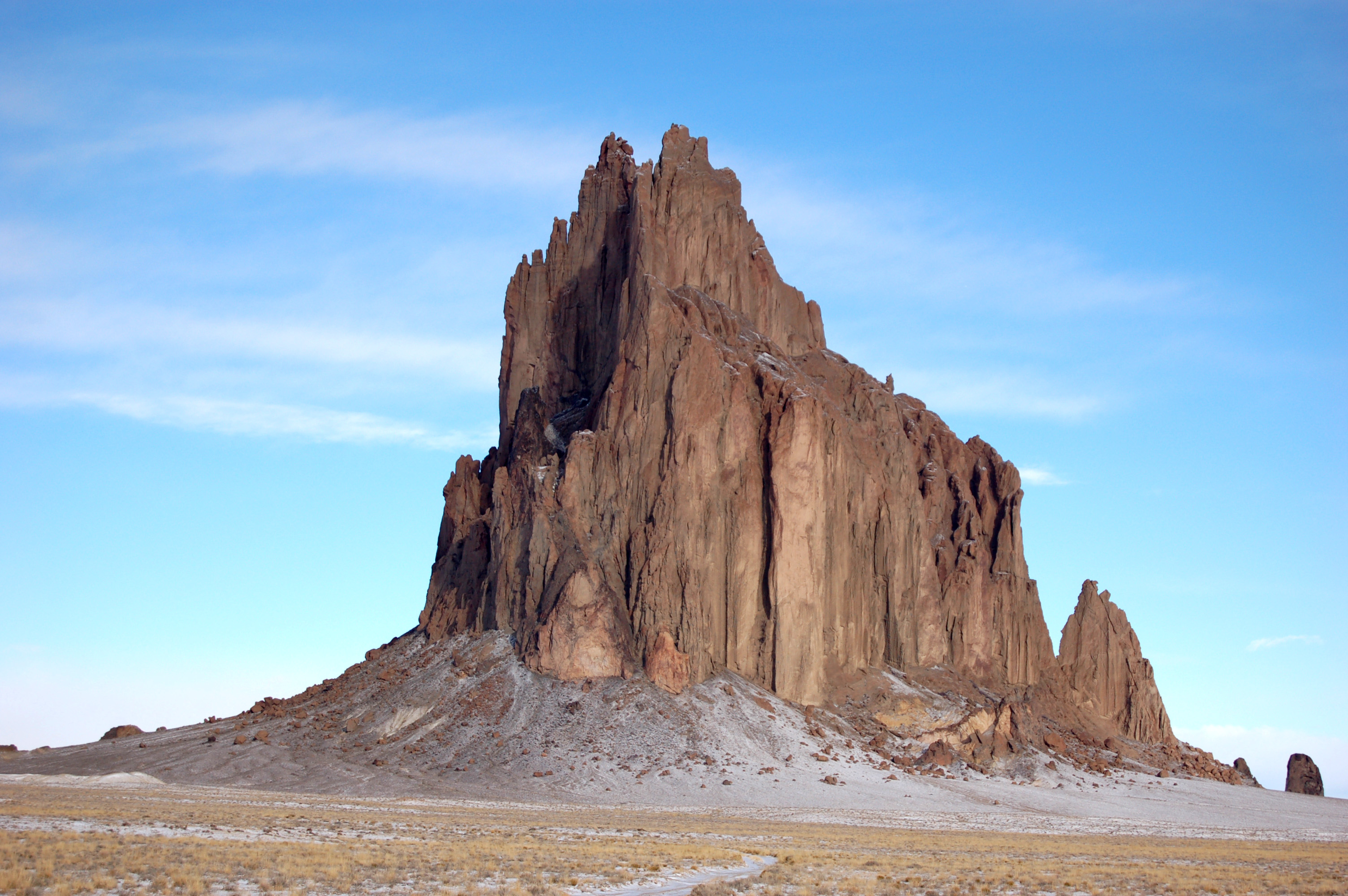
Shiprock

- Ah-Shi-Sle-Pah Wilderness Study Area
- Barber Peak
- Bennett Peak
- Bisti/De-Na-Zin Wilderness
- Cabezon Peak
- Cathedral Cliff
- City of Rocks State Park, Grant County
- Echo Amphitheater
- Elephant Butte
- El Morro National Monument
- Ford Butte
- Kneeling Nun, Hanover, Grant County
- La Ventana Natural Arch
- Mitten Rock
- Natural Bridge, Corona, Lincoln County
- Navajo Church
- Needles Eye, Cooney, Catron County
- Needles Eye Arch and Little Needles Eye Arch, Florida Mountains, Luna County
- Pyramid Rock
- Saddle Rock, Grant County
- Shiprock
- Kasha-Katuwe Tent Rocks National Monument, Cochiti
- Tooth of Time, Colfax County
- Victorio Peak

== New York ==
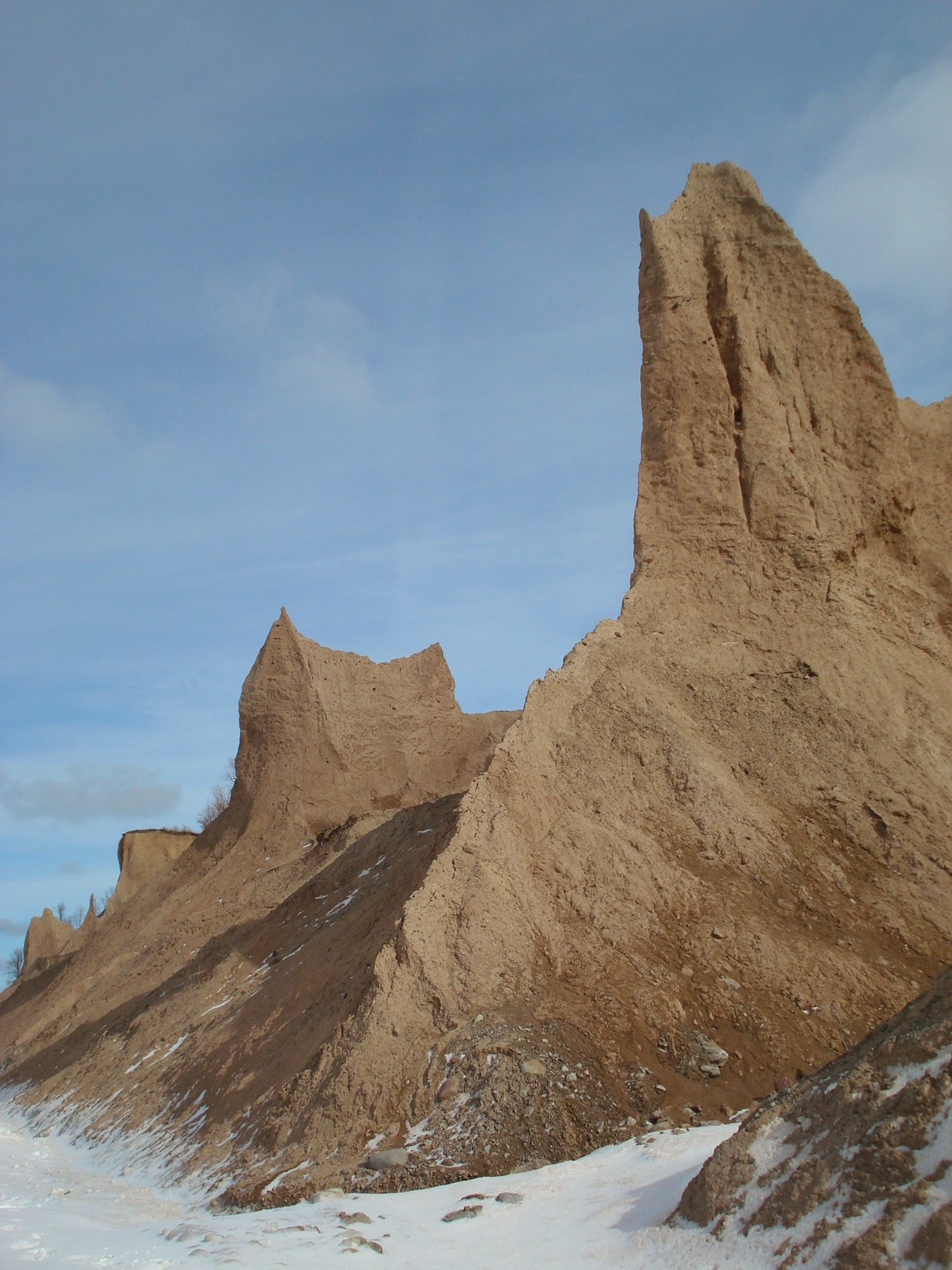
Chimney Bluffs

- Chimney Bluffs State Park
- Lemon Squeezer, Harriman State Park
- The Palisades
- Rat Rock
  - Rat Rock, Central Park, New York City
  - Rat Rock (Morningside Heights), New York City
- Rock City State Forest
- Sam's Point Preserve
- Stark's Knob
- Watkins Glen State Park

== North Carolina ==
- Blowing Rock
- Chimney Rock State Park
- Hanging Rock State Park
  - Cook's Wall
  - Hanging Rock
  - House Rock
  - Moore's Knob
  - Wolf Rock
- Judaculla Rock
- Looking Glass Rock
- McRae Peak, Grandfather Mountain

== Oklahoma ==
- Rock Mary

== Oregon ==
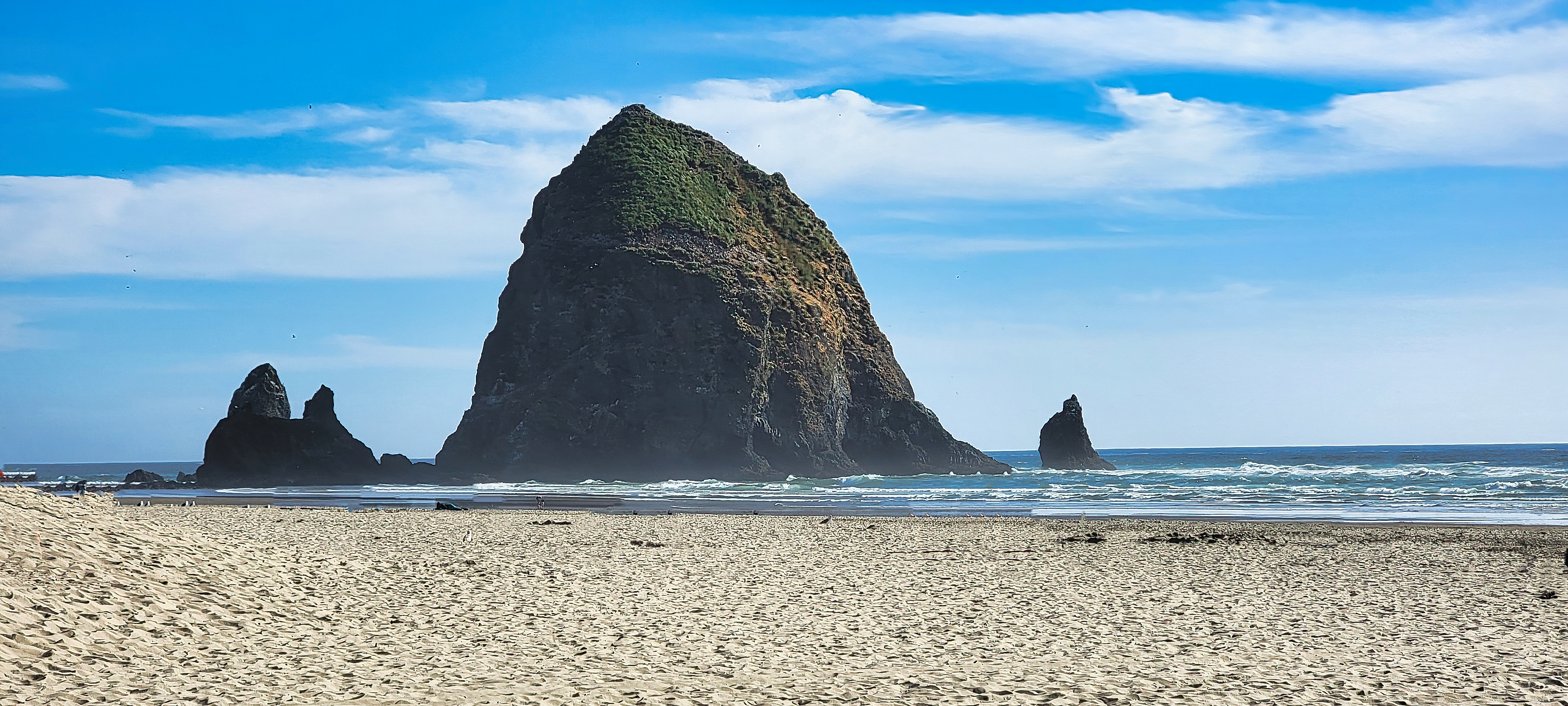
Haystack Rock at Cannon Beach

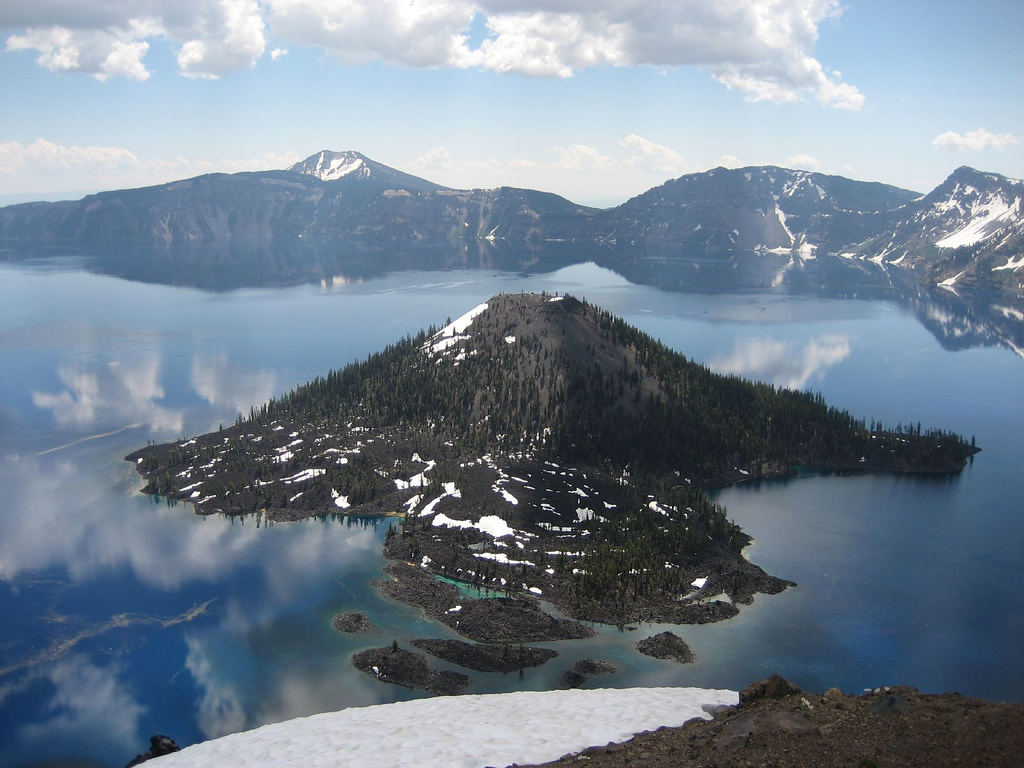
Wizard Island

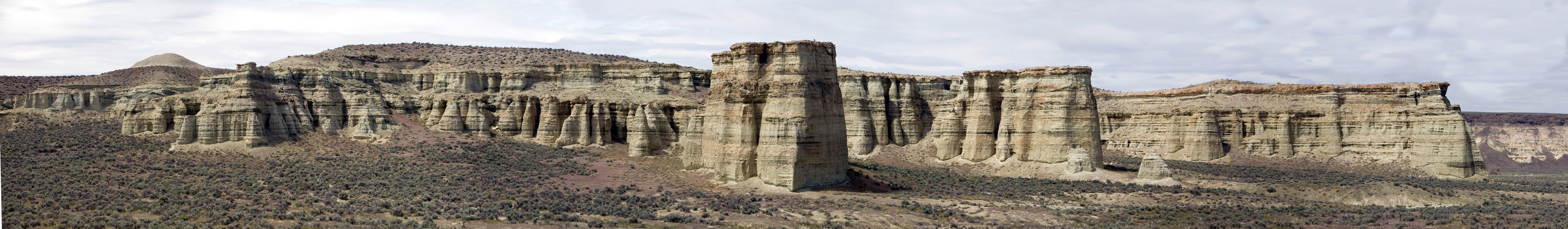
Pillars of Rome

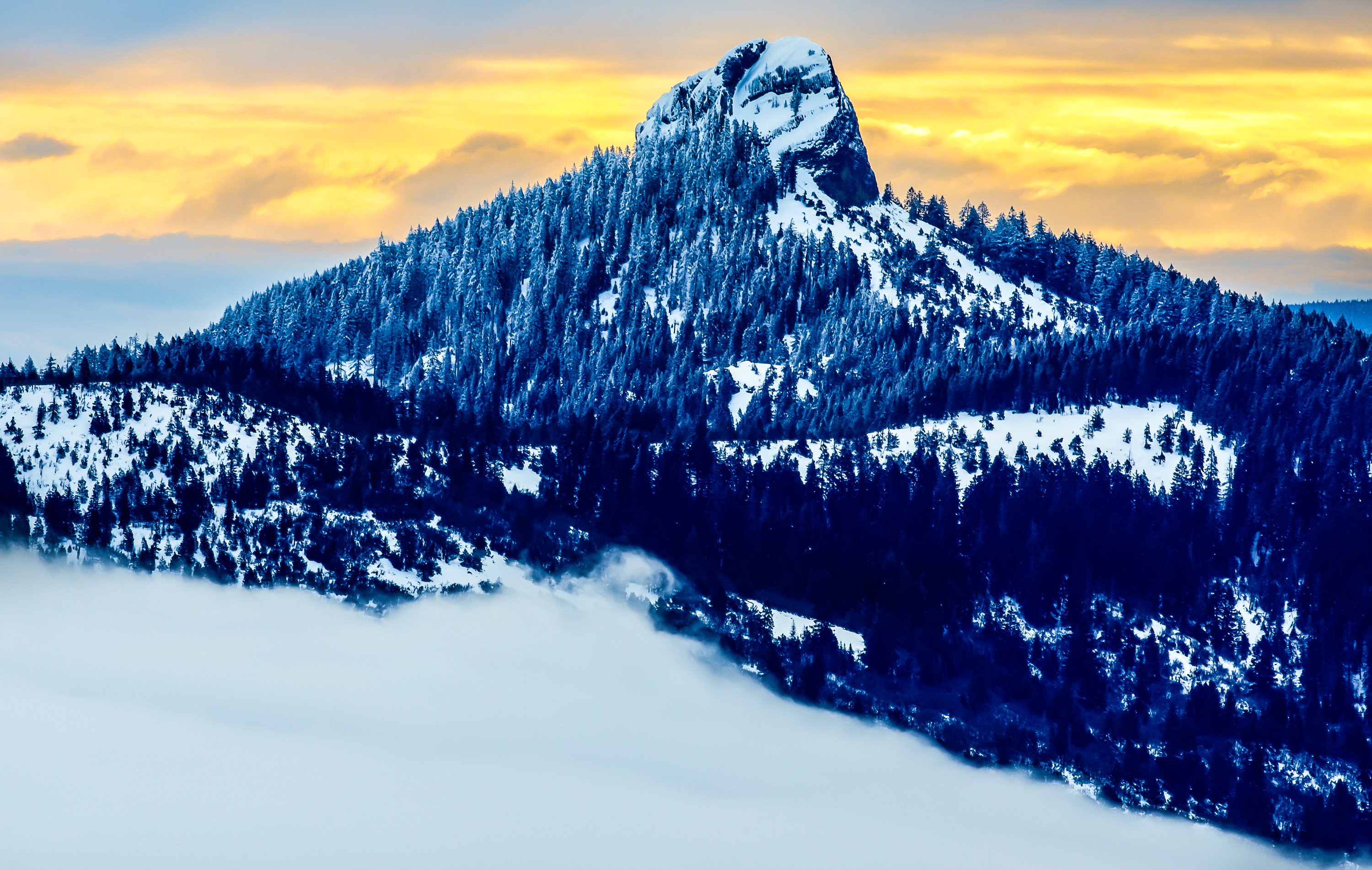
Pilot Rock

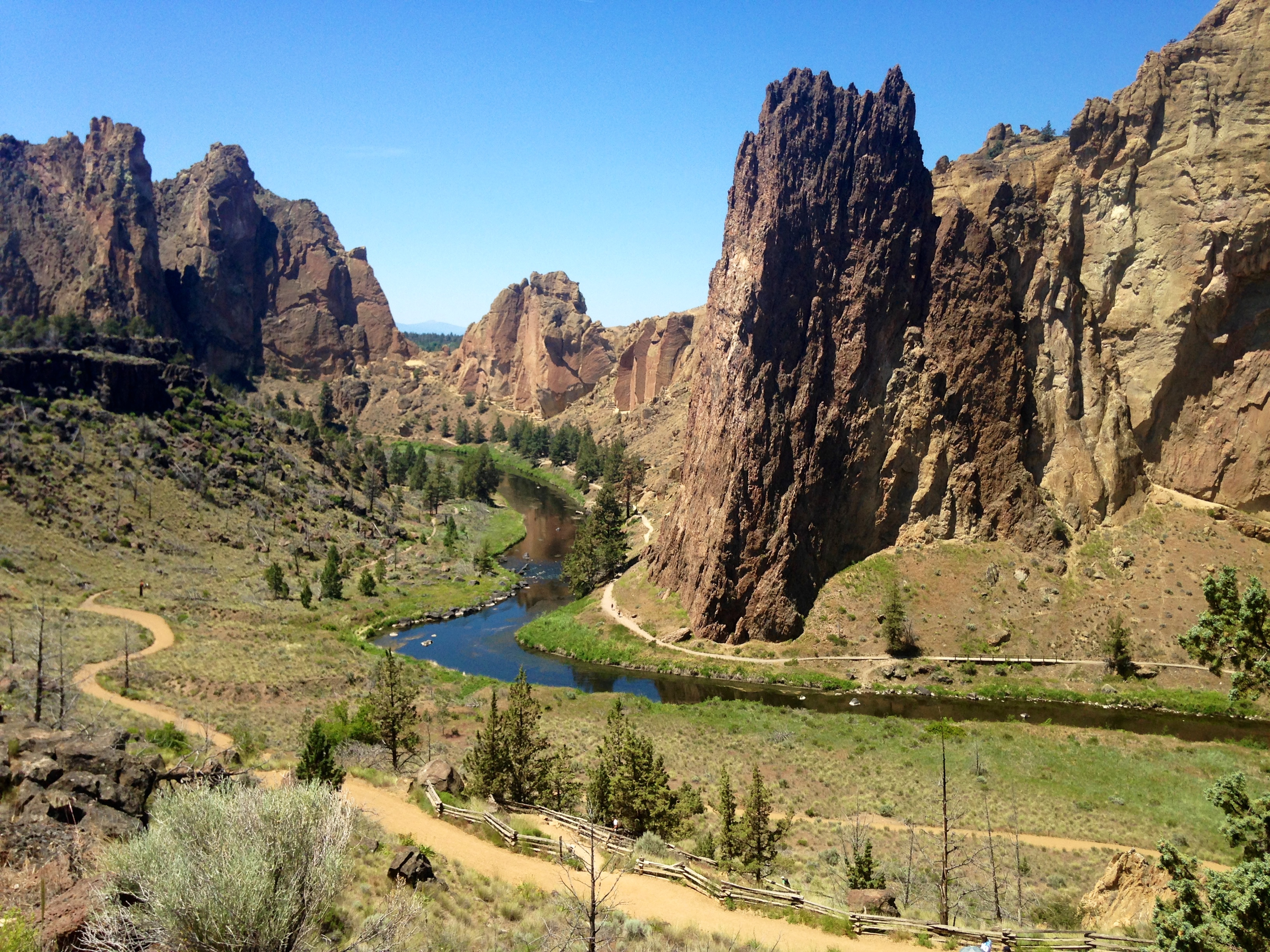
Smith Rock

- Crater Lake
  - Llao Rock
  - Phantom Ship
  - The Pinnacles
  - Wizard Island
- Crown Point, Multnomah County
- Devils Punch Bowl, Lincoln County
- Face Rock, Coos County
- Fort Rock, Lake County
- Haystack Rock, Clatsop County
- Haystack Rock, Tillamook County
- The Honeycombs, Malheur County
- John Day Fossil Beds
  - Clarno Palisades, Wheeler County
  - Sheep Rock, Grant County
- Leslie Gulch, Malheur County
- Malheur Butte, Malheur County
- Mitchell Point, Hood River County
- Natural Bridges,Curry County
- Newberry Volcano, Deschutes County
  - Big Obsidian Flow
  - Lava Butte
  - Paulina Peak
- Old Man and Old Woman Pinnacles, Douglas County
- Pillars of Rome, Malheur County
- Pilot Rock, Jackson County
- Proposal Rock, Tillamook County
- Rooster Rock, Multnomah County
- Smith Rock, Deschutes County
- Steens Mountain, Harney County
- Steins Pillar, Crook County
- Skinner Butte, Lane County
- Spencer Butte, Lane County
- Table Rocks, Jackson County

== Pennsylvania ==
- Bilger's Rocks
- Delaware Water Gap
- Indian God Rock
- Ticklish Rock

== South Dakota ==
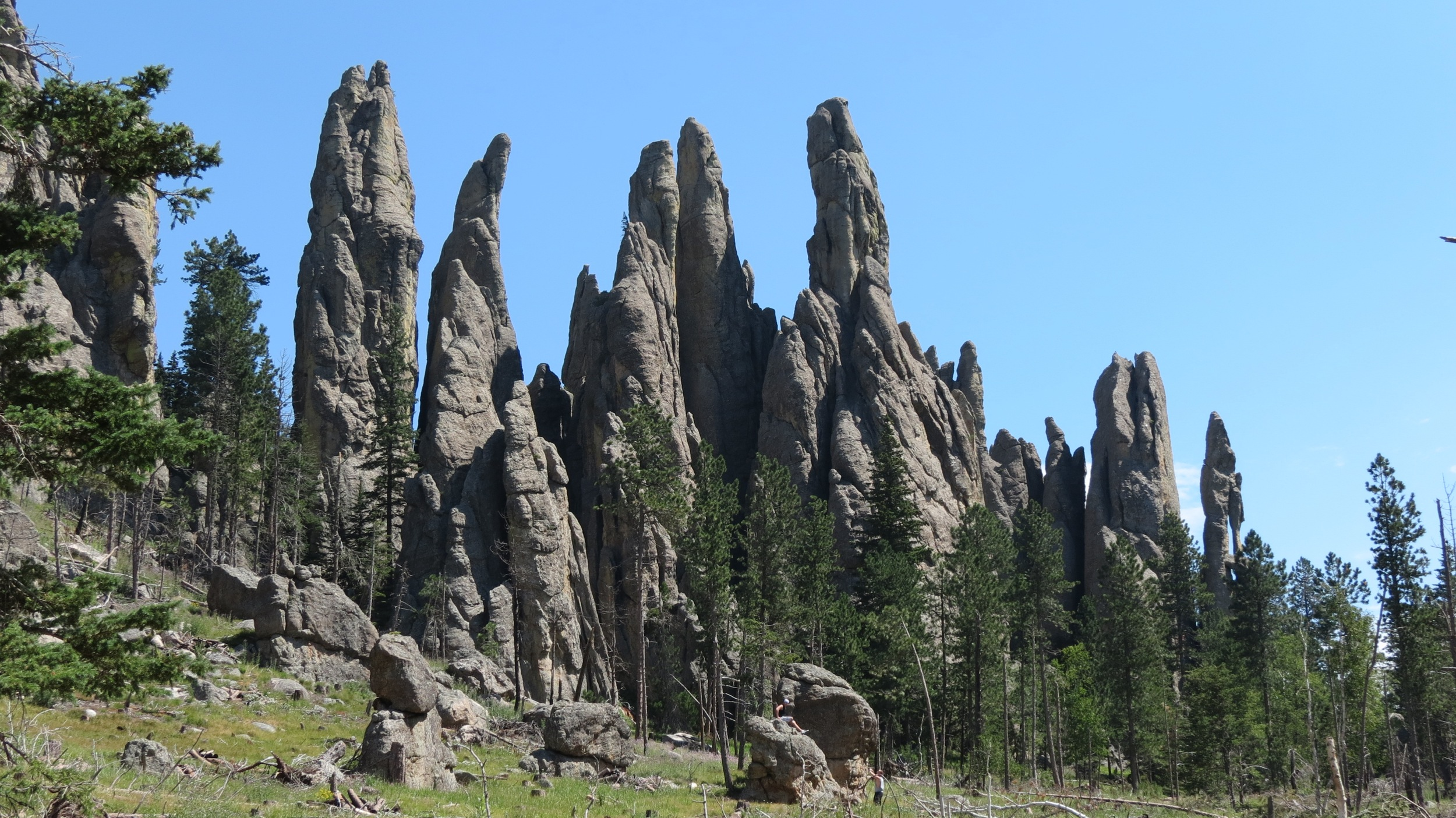
The Needles

- Mount Rushmore
- The Needles, Custer State Park

== Tennessee ==
- Chimney Rocks, Campbell County
- Twin Arches, Pickett County

== Texas ==
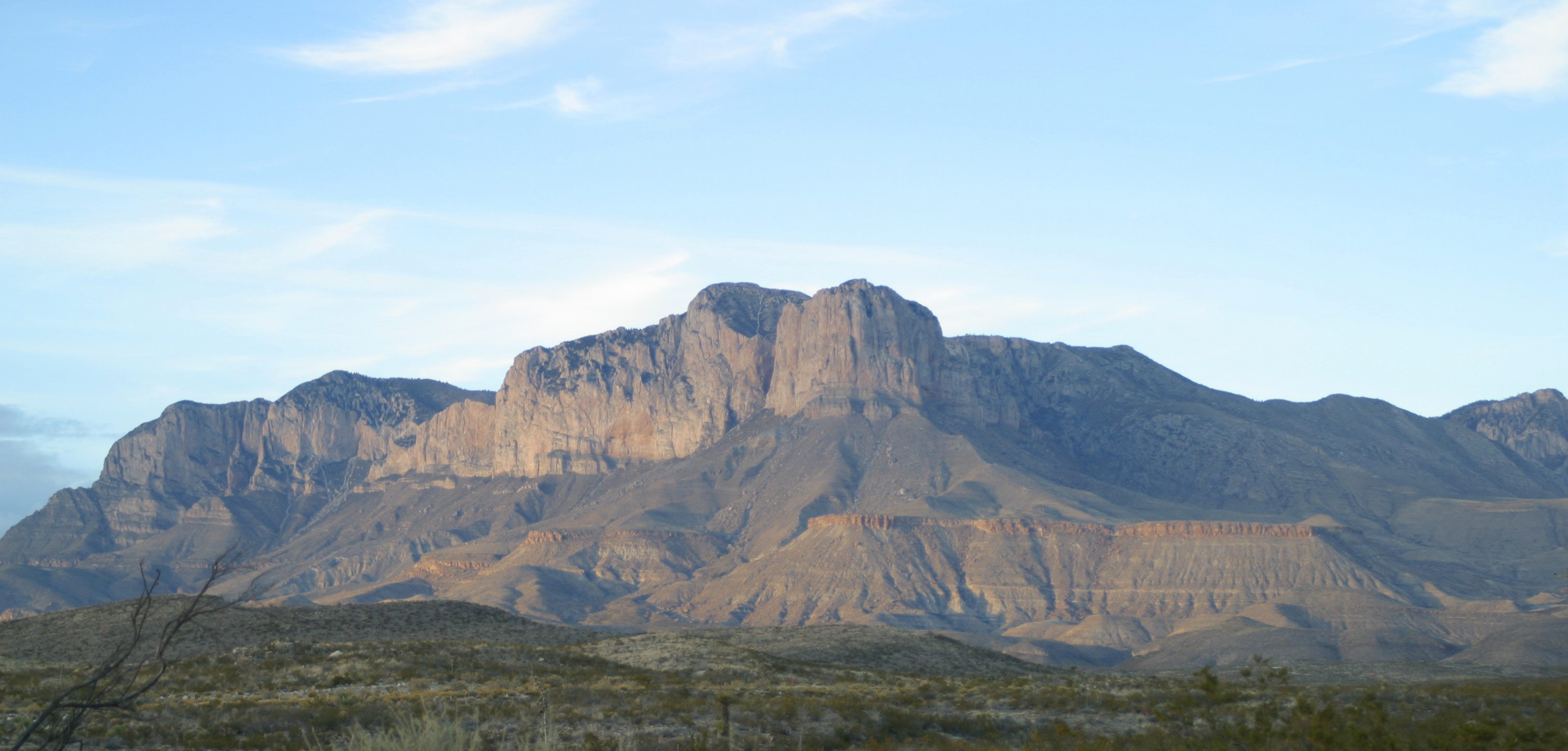
El Capitan Reef

- Big Bend National Park
  - Elephant Tusk
  - Mule Ears
  - Santa Elena Canyon
- Duffy's Peak
- El Capitan, Guadalupe Mountains National Park
- Enchanted Rock, Gillespie County/Llano County
- Hueco Tanks, Hueco Tanks State Park & Historic Site, El Paso County
- Palo Duro Canyon, Amarillo
- Spy Rock, Mason County

== Utah ==
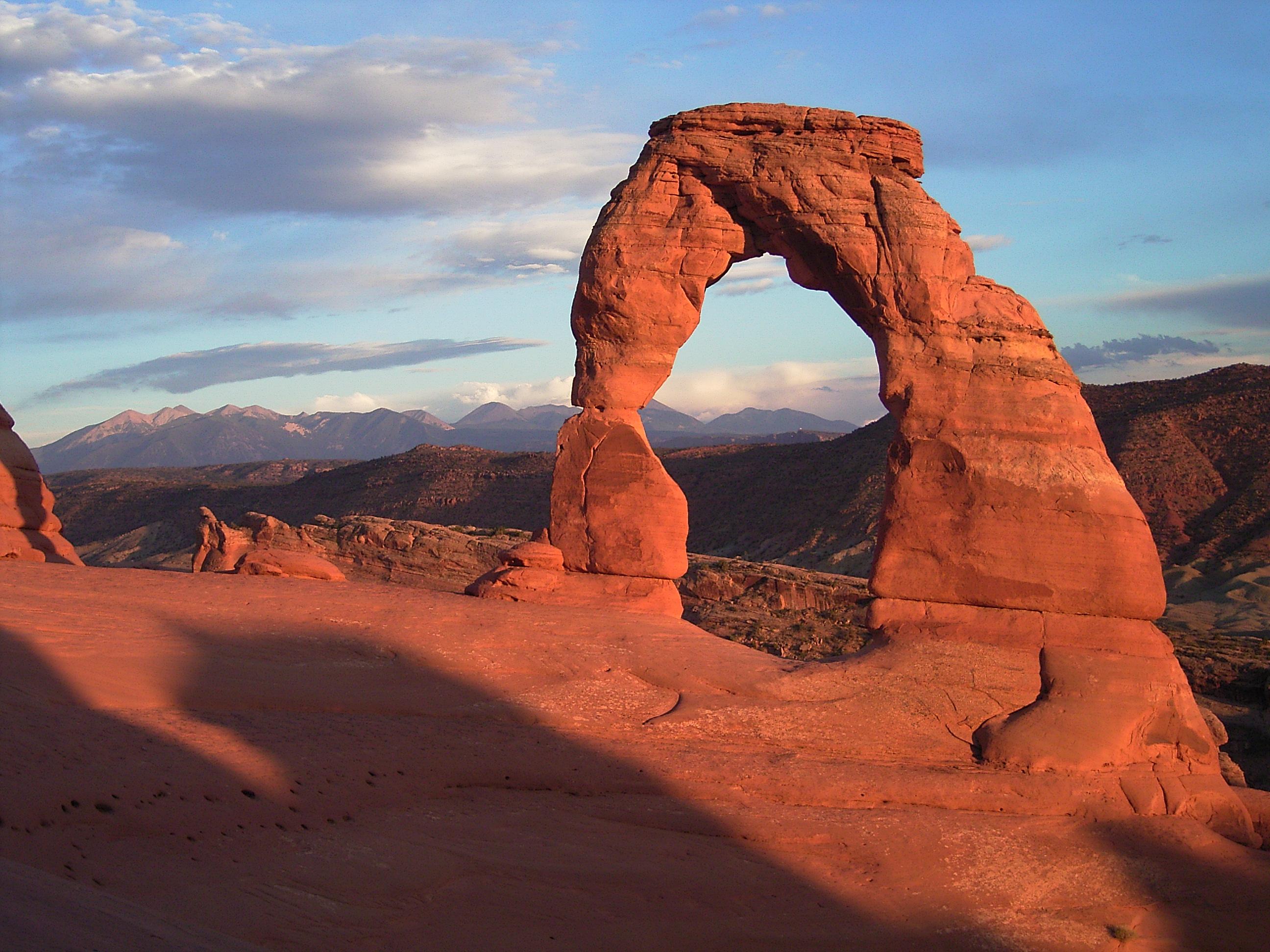
Delicate Arch

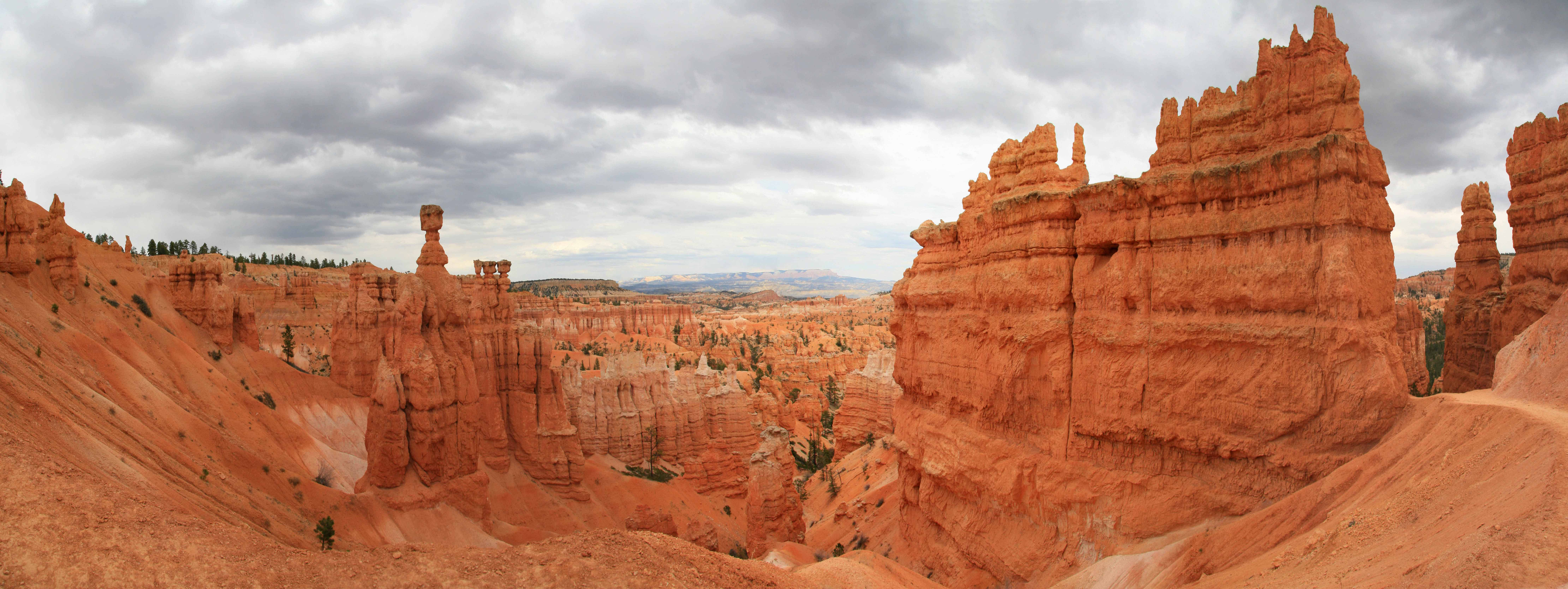
Thor's Hammer

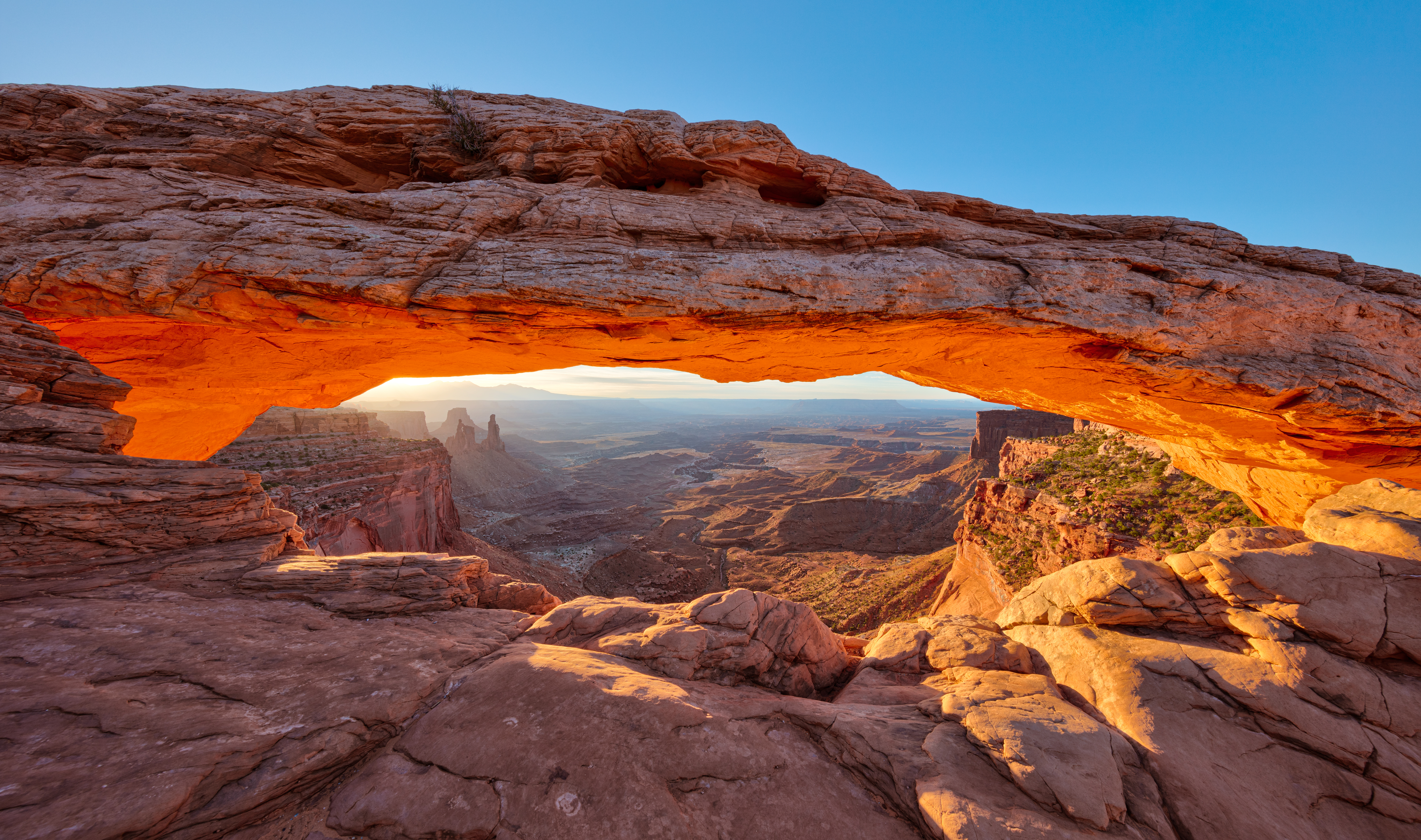
Mesa Arch

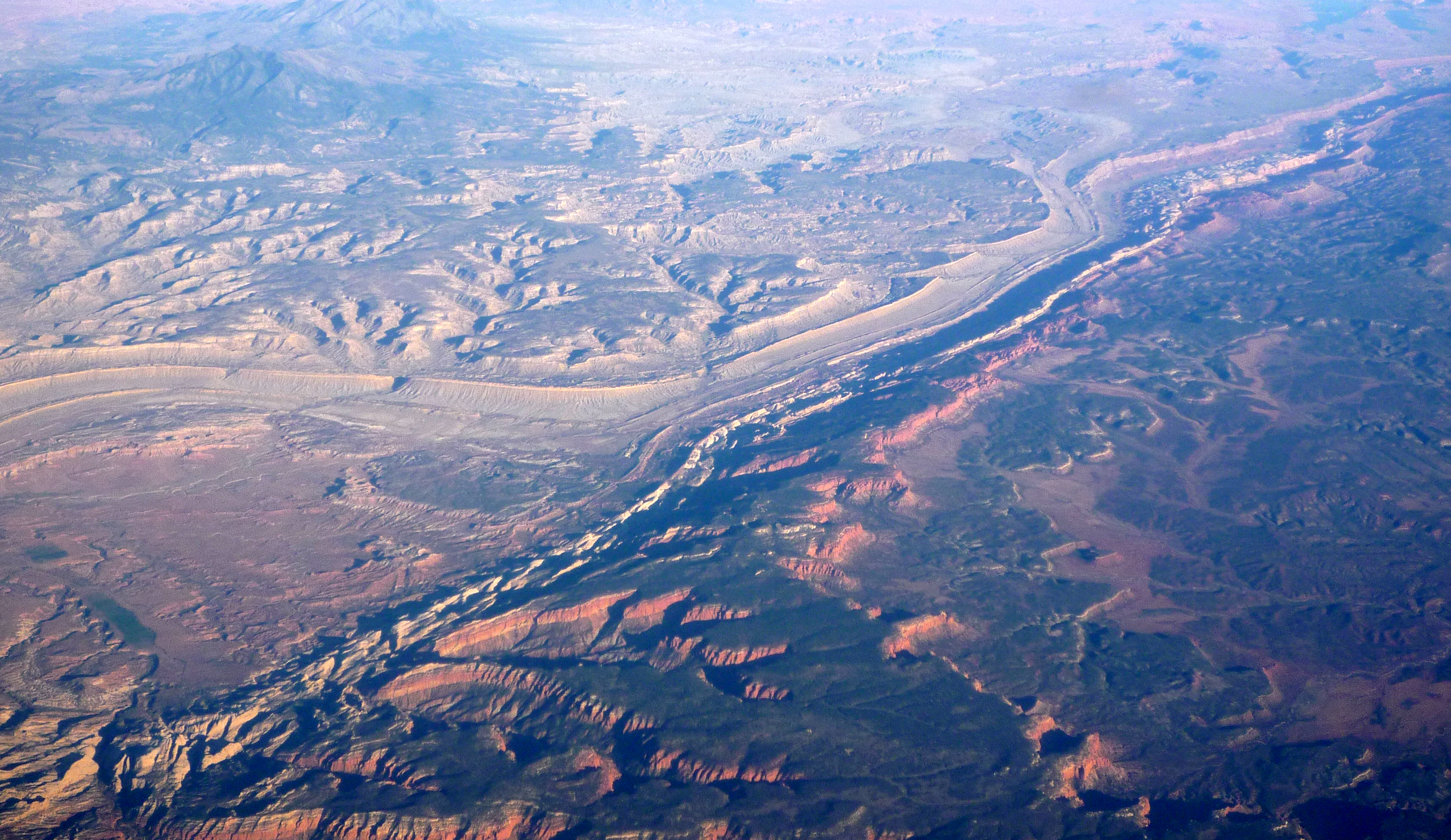
Waterpocket Fold

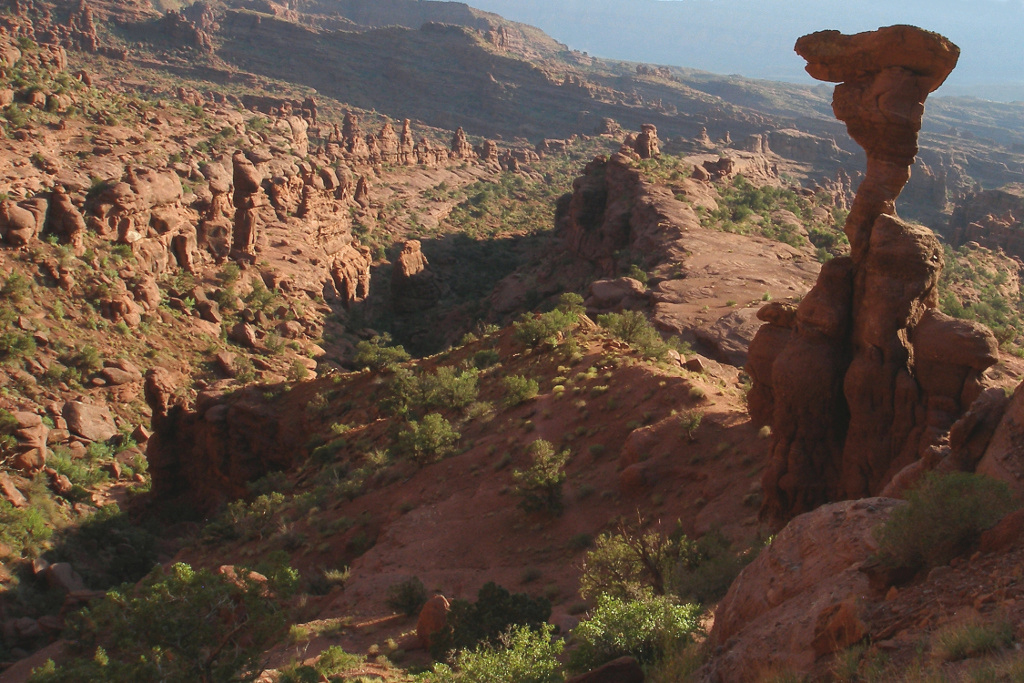
Toadstool, Fisher Towers

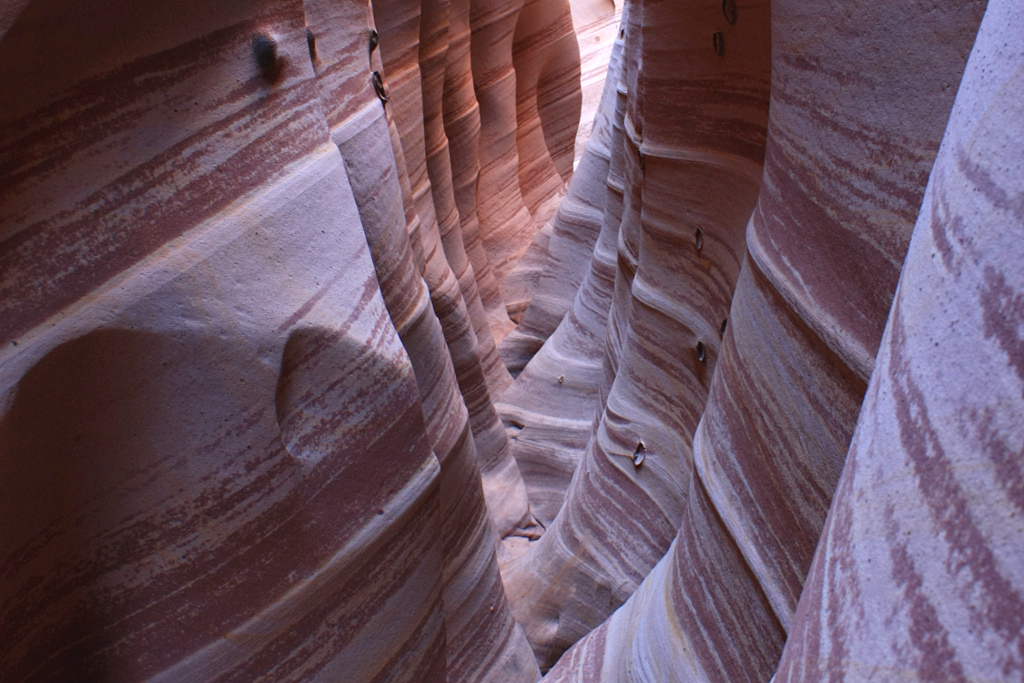
Zebra Canyon

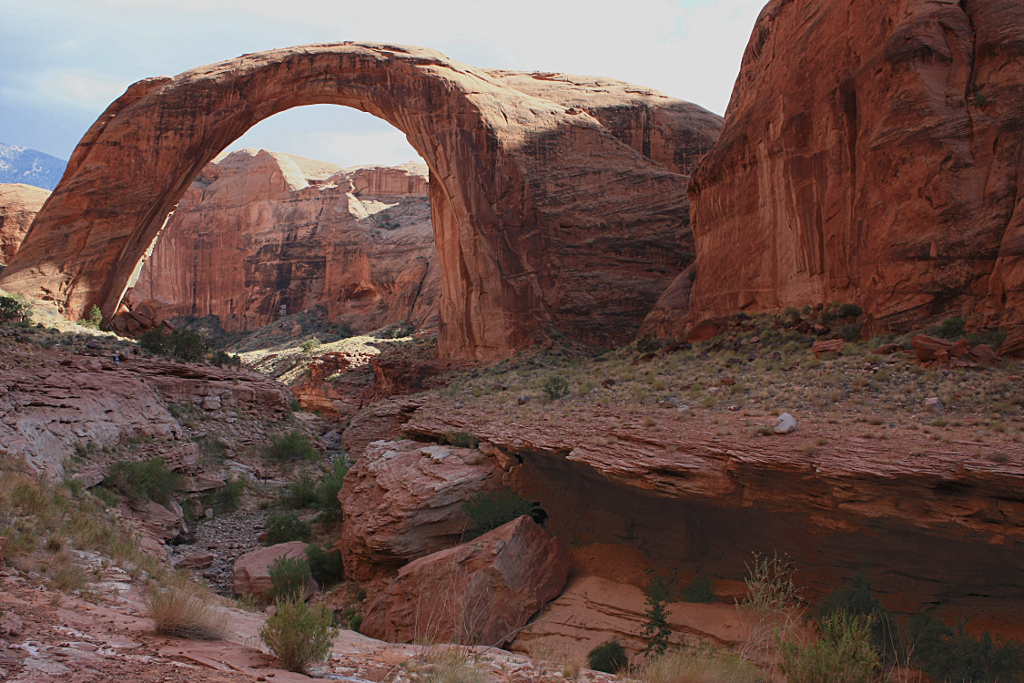
Rainbow Bridge

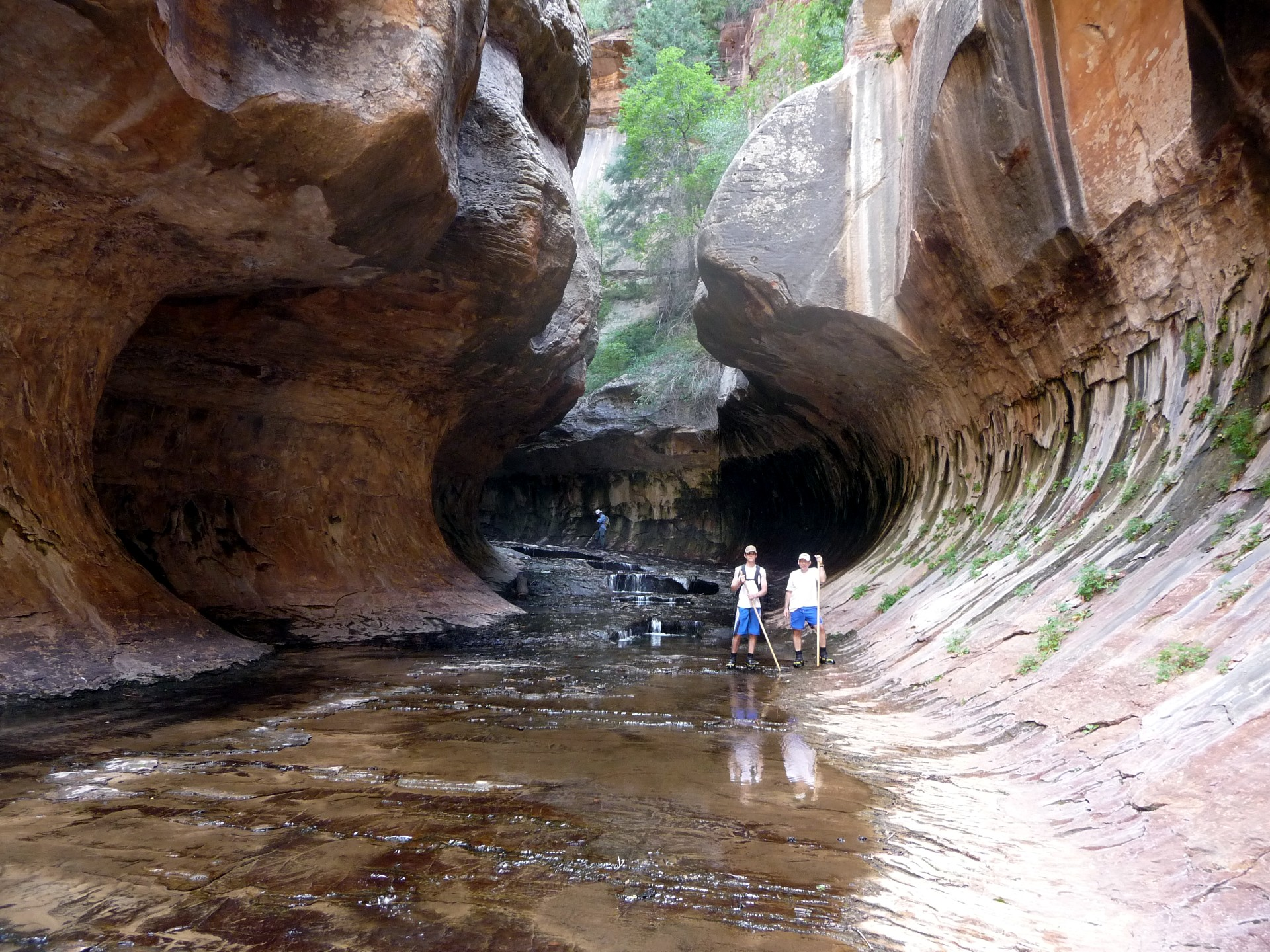
Entrance to The Subway

- Adobe Mesa
- Arches National Park
  - Argon Tower
  - Balanced Rock
  - Courthouse Towers
  - Dark Angel
  - Delicate Arch
  - Devils Garden
  - Double Arch
  - Fiery Furnace
  - Jello Tower
  - Landscape Arch
  - Marching Men
  - Mars Hotel
  - Petrified Dunes
  - Queen Nefertiti Rock
  - Queen Victoria Rock
  - Sheep Rock
  - The Candelabrum
  - The Organ
  - The Phallus
  - Three Penguins
  - Tower of Babel
  - Wall Arch (collapsed in 2008)
- Battleship Butte
- Bears Ears National Monument
  - Bridger Jack Butte
  - Sixshooter Peaks
  - United Nations Tablet
- Bottleneck Peak
- Boundary Butte
- Bryce Canyon National Park
  - Sinking Ship
  - Thor's Hammer
- Buttes of the Cross
- Canyonlands National Park
  - Airport Tower
  - Angel Arch
  - Aztec Butte
  - Candlestick Tower
  - Chip and Dale Towers
  - Druid Arch
  - Elaterite Butte
  - Island in the Sky
  - Islet in the Sky
  - Junction Butte
  - Mesa Arch
  - Outlaw Spire
  - Tiki Tower
  - Monster Tower
  - Upheaval Dome
  - Washer Woman
  - Whale Rock
  - Zeus and Moses
- Capitol Reef National Park
  - Capitol Dome
  - Capitol Gorge
  - Cassidy Arch
  - The Castle
  - Cathedral Mountain
  - Chimney Rock
  - EPH Hanks Tower
  - Ferns Nipple
  - Golden Throne
  - Hickman Bridge
  - Jailhouse Rock
  - Navajo Dome
  - Needle Mountain
  - Pectols Pyramid
  - Temples of the Sun and Moon
  - Waterpocket Fold
- Castle Rock
- Castleton Tower
- Cave Knoll
- Cedar Breaks National Monument
- Corona Arch
- Coyote Buttes
- Dead Horse Point State Park
- Devil's Slide
- Dominguez Butte
- Eagle Crags
- Ekker Butte
- Elephant Rock, Kings Canyon, Millard County
- Family Butte
- Fantasy Canyon
- Fisher Towers
  - Ancient Art
  - Cottontail Tower
  - Echo Tower
  - Kingfisher Tower
  - The Oracle
  - The Titan
- Goblin Valley State Park
  - Mollys Castle
  - Wild Horse Butte
- Grand Staircase–Escalante National Monument
  - Coyote Gulch
  - Devils Garden
  - Grosvenor Arch
  - Hole in the Rock
  - Peekaboo Canyon
  - Spooky Canyon
  - Zebra Canyon
- Gregory Butte
- Gunnison Butte
- Gunsight Butte
- Kodachrome Basin State Park
- Lone Rock (Lake Powell)
- Merrimac Butte
- Mexican Hat
- Monument Valley
  - Big Indian
  - Brighams Tomb
  - Castle Rock
  - King-on-his-Throne
  - Setting Hen
  - Stagecoach
- Natural Bridges National Monument
  - Kachina Natural Bridge
  - Owachomo Natural Bridge
  - Sipapu Natural Bridge
- Newspaper Rock State Historic Monument
- Notch Peak
- Parriott Mesa
- Rainbow Bridge National Monument
- San Rafael Reef
- Sister Superior
- Square Top
- The Convent
- The Rectory
- Valley of the Gods
  - Battleship Rock
  - Bell Butte
  - Castle Butte
  - De Gaulle and His Troops
  - Franklin Butte
  - Lady in the Bathtub
  - Rooster Butte
  - Setting Hen Butte
  - Seven Sailors
- Wilson Arch
- Zion National Park
  - Aires Butte
  - Altar of Sacrifice
  - Angel's Landing
  - Ant Hill
  - Bee Hive
  - Checkerboard Mesa
  - Court of the Patriarchs
  - The East Temple
  - The Great White Throne
  - Kolob Arch
  - Meridian Tower
  - Narrows
  - Northgate Peaks
  - North Guardian Angel
  - The Organ
  - Paria Point
  - The Pulpit
  - The Sentinel
  - South Guardian Angel
  - The Subway
  - The Watchman
  - The West Temple
  - Three Patriarchs
  - Three Marys
  - The Witch Head
  - Towers of the Virgin

== Vermont ==
- The Beam

== Virginia ==
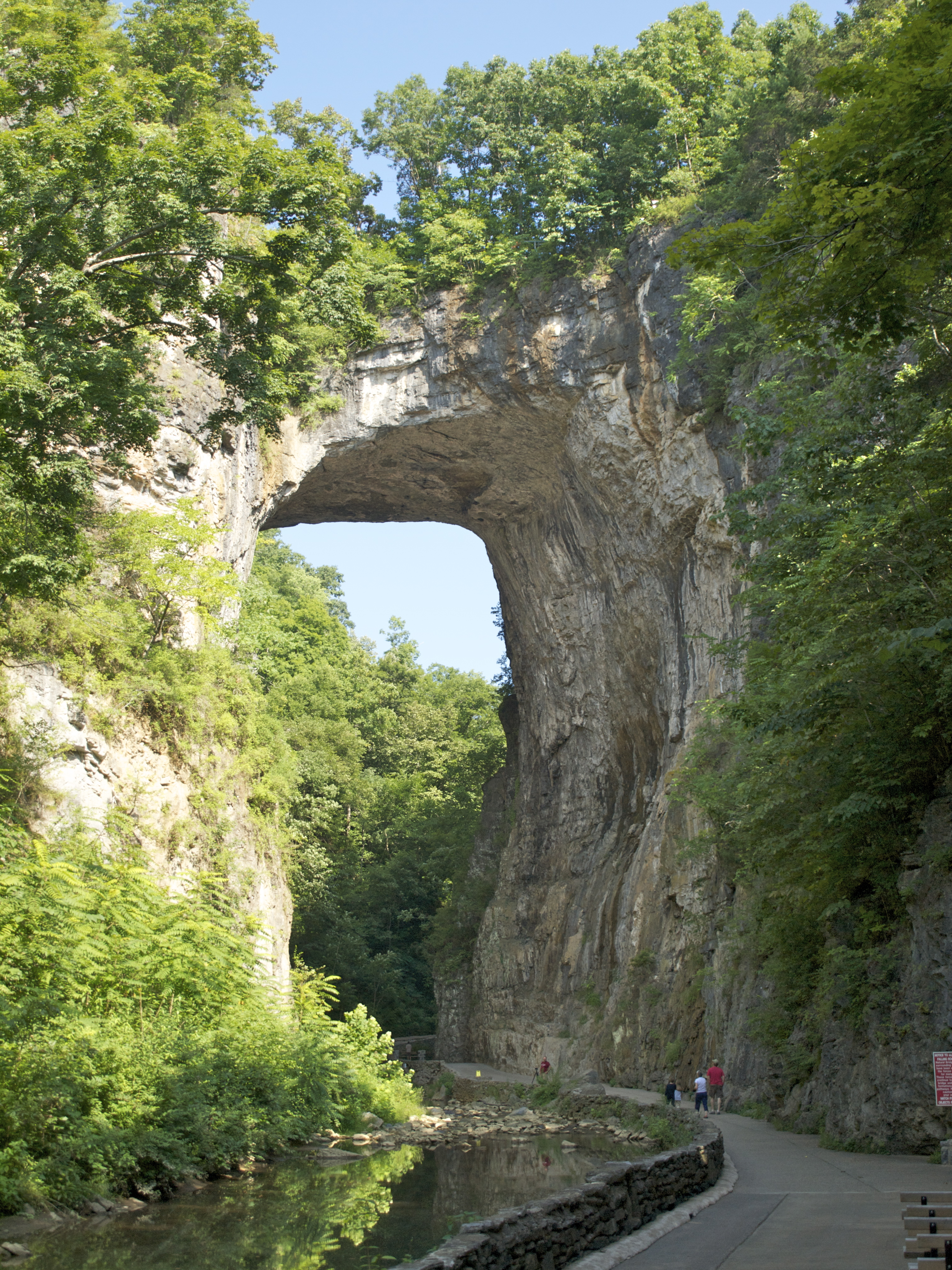
Natural Bridge

- Humpback Rock
- Natural Bridge
- Natural Chimneys

== Washington ==
- Beacon Rock, Columbia River Gorge
- Cupalo Rock
- Gilhooley Tower
- Jabberwocky Tower
- Lexington Tower
- Omak Rock
- Ruby Beach, Olympic National Park
- Sims Corner Eskers and Kames National Natural Landmark
- Steamboat Rock, Steamboat Rock State Park
- Steeple Rock, Olympic National Park
- The Tooth

== West Virginia ==
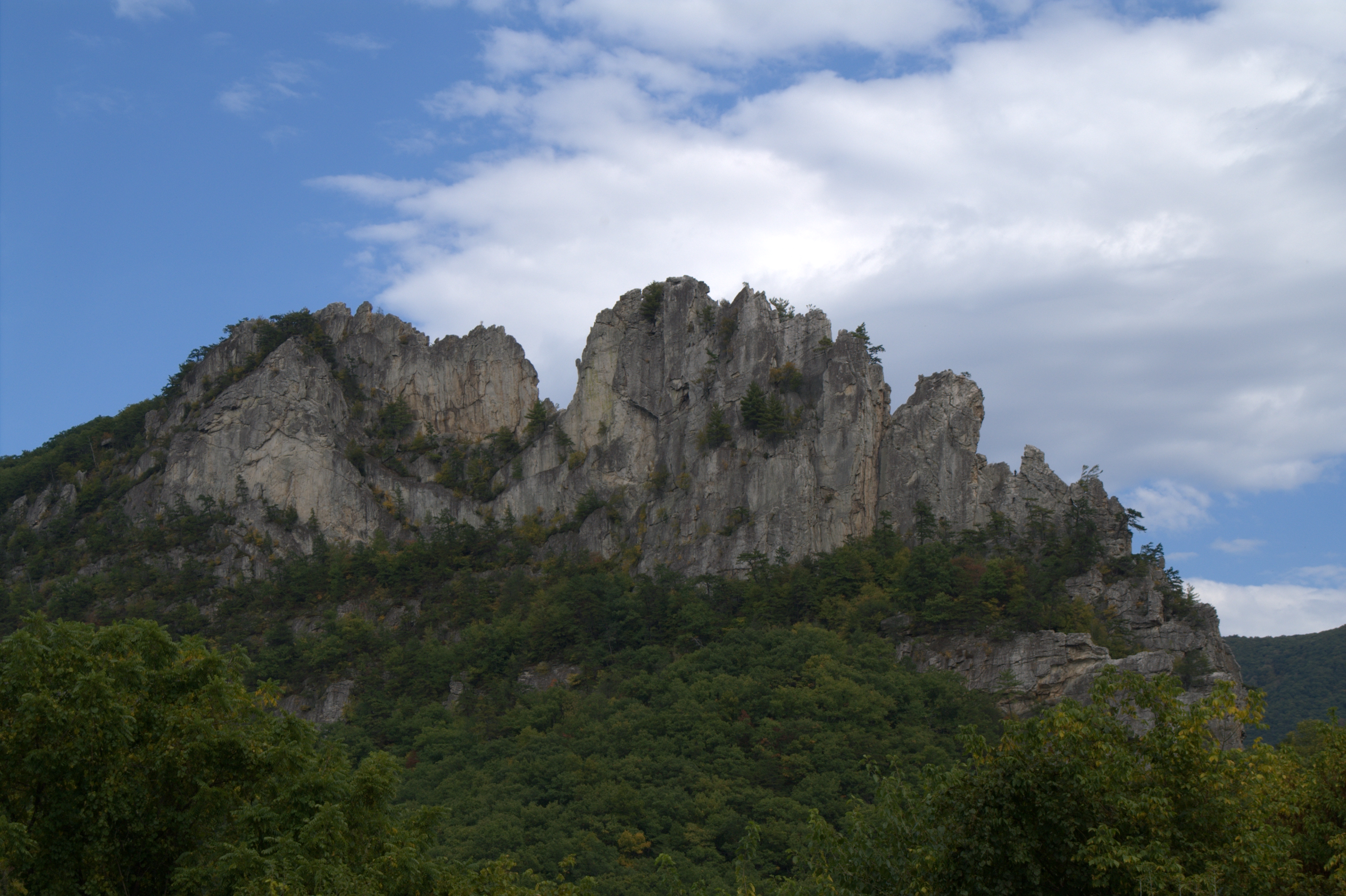
Seneca Rocks

- Cooper's Rock
- Seneca Rocks, Pendleton County

== Wisconsin ==
- Dells of the Wisconsin River
- Maiden Rock
- Mill Bluff State Park
- Natural Bridge State Park

== Wyoming ==
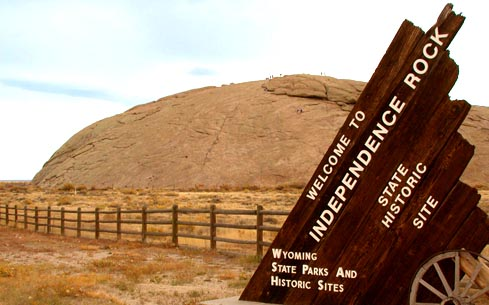
Independence Rock

- Devil's Gate
- Devils Tower
- Hell's Half Acre
- Independence Rock
- Pinnacle Buttes
- Teapot Rock
- Vedauwoo
