= Lemon squeezer (disambiguation) =

A lemon squeezer is a kitchen utensil.

Lemon squeezer may also refer to:

- Lemon squeezer (rock formation), a rock formation in New York state in the United States
- Lemon squeezer (hat) a nickname for the New Zealand Army version of the Stetson hat
- Lemon squeezer (revolver), a nickname for the Smith & Wesson Safety Hammerless
