= Gull Rock =

- 37.876038°N 122.616369°W Gull Rock (California) Gull Rock (the United States)

Geography
- Location: Northern California
- Adjacent to: Pacific Ocean

Administration
- United States
- State: California
- County: Marin

Gull Rock is a rock formation and a small rocky island in Marin County, in the U.S. state of California. It lies in the Pacific Ocean just offshore of the Golden Gate National Recreation Area.

== See also ==
- List of islands of California
