= San Pedro Rock =

Rock island in California

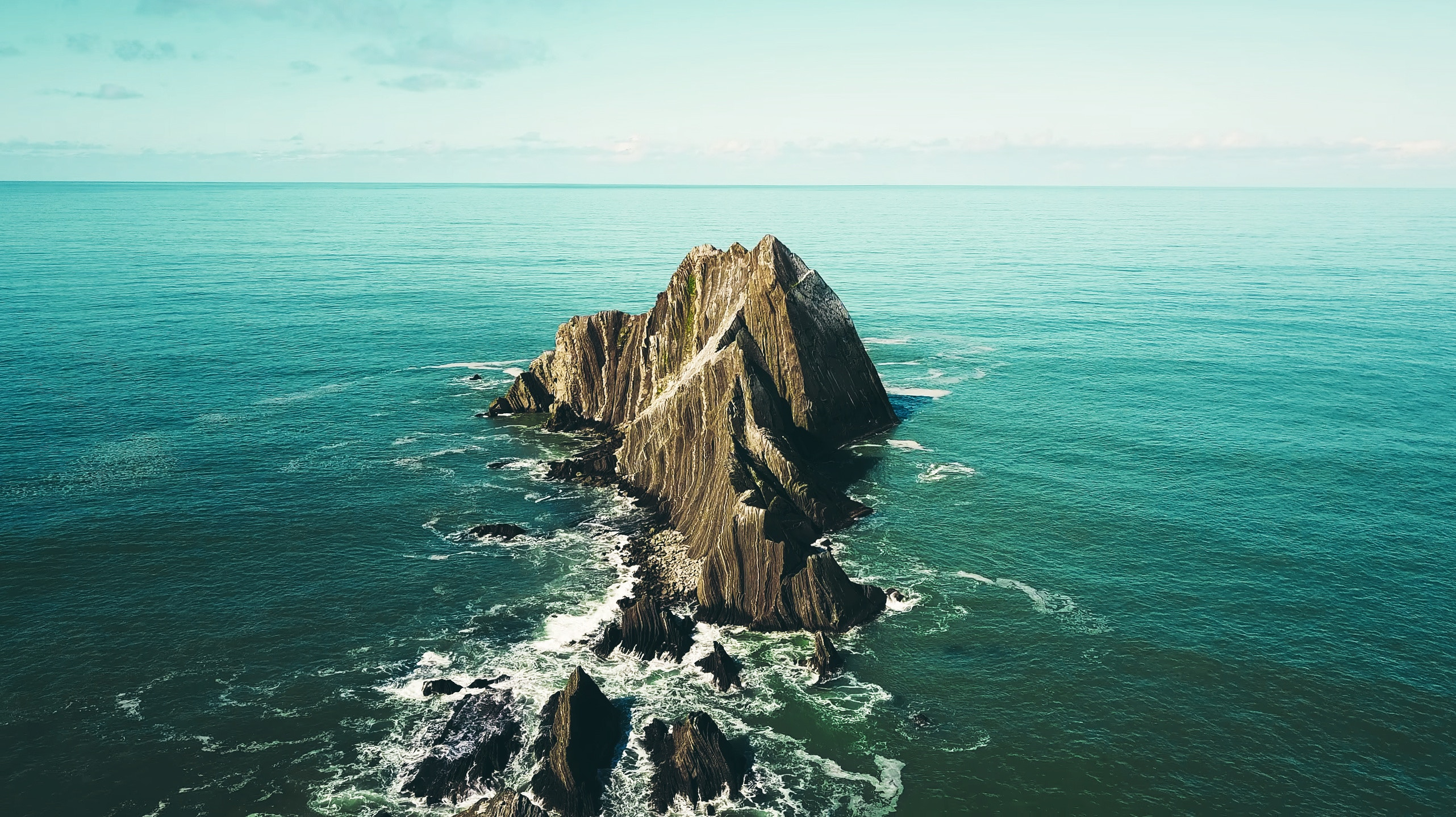
- San Pedro Rock viewed from Devil's Slide Trail

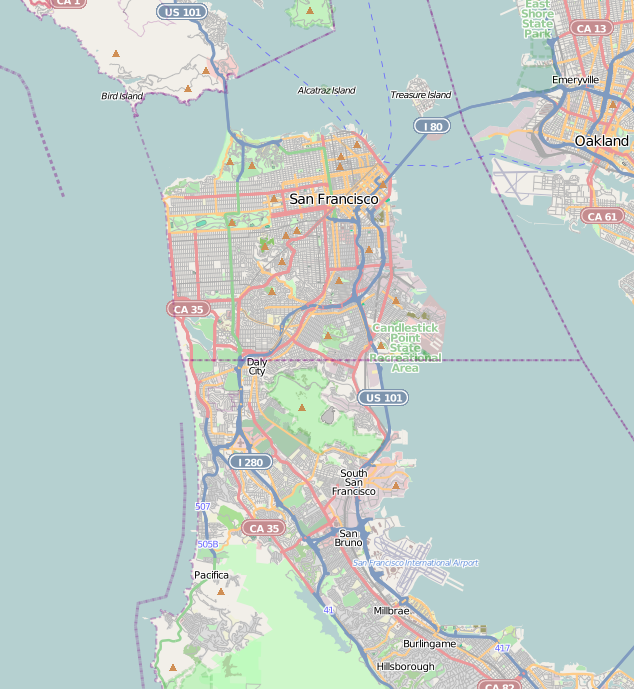
- Location within San Francisco Location within California Location within the United States

Geography
- Coordinates: 37°35′43″N 122°31′27″W
- Total islands: 1

Administration
- United States
- State: California
- County: San Mateo

San Pedro Rock is a rock formation and small island off Point San Pedro in Pacifica, California, in the San Francisco Bay Area's San Mateo County.

Access is only during low tide via a 1.2 mile path from Pacifica State Beach. At other times, access is blocked by private properties.

== See also ==
- List of islands of California
