= Elephants Playground =

Rock formation in California, United States

Coordinates: 40.0667°N 120.6167°W

The Elephants Playground is a rock formation located in Genesee, Plumas County, California. The area burned in the 2019 Walker Fire.

== Description ==
Elephant's Playground was named by early Anglo-American settlers because the boulders can resemble a herd of elephant torsos. The boulder rock formations are huge, round, somewhat smooth and tightly packed.

Elephants Playground has been noted for its unusual place name.

== See also ==
- Indian Creek
