= Lemon squeezer (rock formation) =

Coordinates: 41°15′29.7″N 74°8′0.08″W

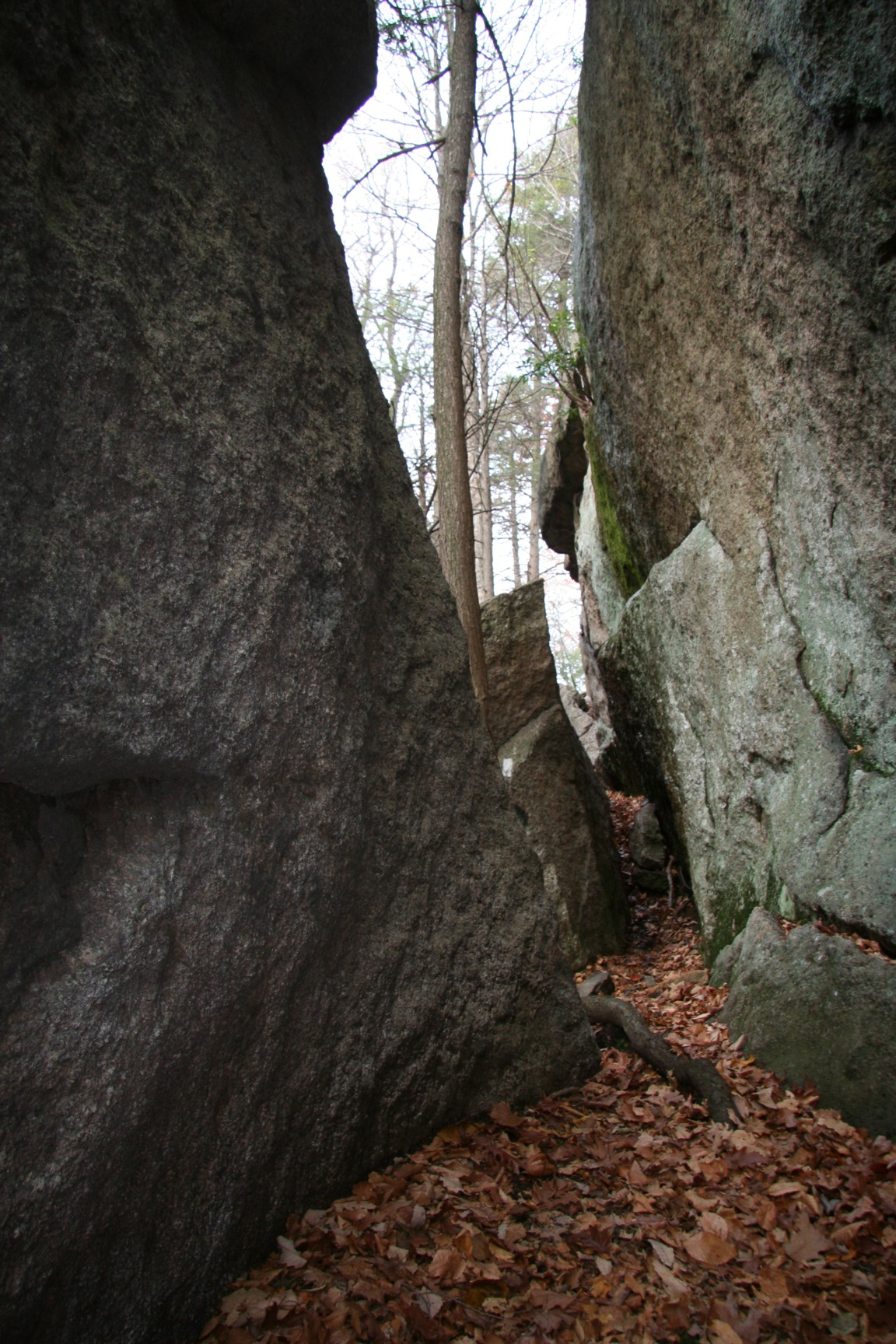
Entrance to the Lemon Squeezer

The Lemon Squeezer is an unusual rock formation in Harriman State Park, New York. It is located at the intersection of the Appalachian Trail (White) and the Arden-Surebridge Trail (Red Triangle), near the base of Island Pond Mountain in the town of Tuxedo.

The trail initially passes under a large boulder resting on top of other rocks. After passing this point, the nature of the Lemon Squeezer becomes apparent as the hiker gets "squeezed" through a path that is three feet (1 m) high, one foot (0.3 m) wide, and angled 15 degrees. The trail then continues through additional rock formations where pine trees grow on top of a thin rock ceiling above the path.

The Lemon Squeezer was named by J. Ashton Allis, one of the founders and literal trailblazers of the Appalachian Trail, who in 1921 first scouted and marked the Arden-Surebridge Trail.
