= Raven Rock (Kentucky) =

Sandstone protrusion in the Red River Gorge

Coordinates: 37°50′08.9″N 83°39′59.1″W

Raven Rock is a sandstone protrusion in the Daniel Boone National Forest, overlooking Kentucky's Red River within the Red River Gorge. The rock is over 1,280 feet tall and has massive cliffs on three sides. Although there is no official trail to the top, it can be accessed by a paved road where a past owner tried to bring tourism to the summit. The view from the top of Raven Rock is one of the most spectacular in the area.
