= Aires Butte =

Mountain in Utah, United States

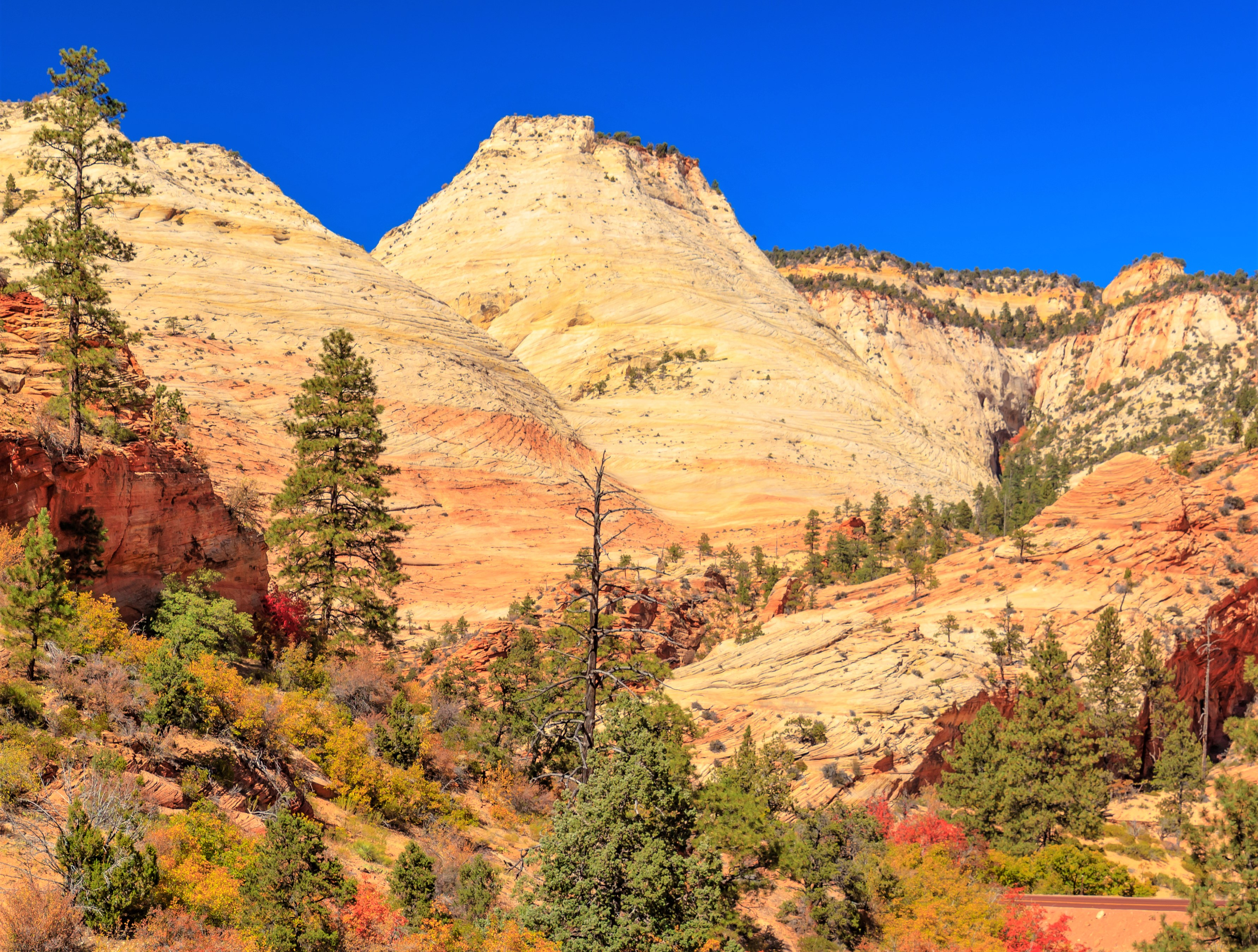
- Southeast aspect, viewed from Highway 9

Highest point
- Elevation: 6,492 ft (1,979 m)
- Prominence: 572 ft (174 m)
- Parent peak: Ant Hill (6,641 ft)
- Isolation: 0.90 mi (1.45 km)
- Coordinates: 37°13′57″N 112°54′27″W

Geography
- Location within Utah Location within the United States
- Country: United States
- State: Utah
- County: Washington
- Protected area: Zion National Park
- Parent range: Colorado Plateau
- Topo map: USGS Springdale East

Geology
- Rock age: Jurassic
- Rock type: Navajo sandstone

Climbing
- Easiest route: class 5.5 climbing

Aires Butte is a 6,492-foot (1,979 m) summit located in Zion National Park, in Washington County of southwest Utah, United States. It is composed of white Navajo Sandstone, and rises 1,100-foot (340-meter) above the Zion – Mount Carmel Highway. Aires Butte is situated 0.9 mi (1.4 km) east-northeast of Ant Hill, 1.5 mi (2.4 km) north of Nippletop, and 1.9 mi (3.1 km) northwest of Checkerboard Mesa. Precipitation runoff from this mountain drains into tributaries of the Virgin River.

== Climate ==
Spring and fall are the most favorable seasons to visit Aires Butte. According to the Köppen climate classification system, it is located in a cold semi-arid climate zone, which is defined by the coldest month having an average mean temperature below 32 °F (0 °C), and at least 50% of the total annual precipitation being received during the spring and summer. This desert climate receives less than 10 inches (250 millimeters) of annual rainfall, and snowfall is generally light during the winter.

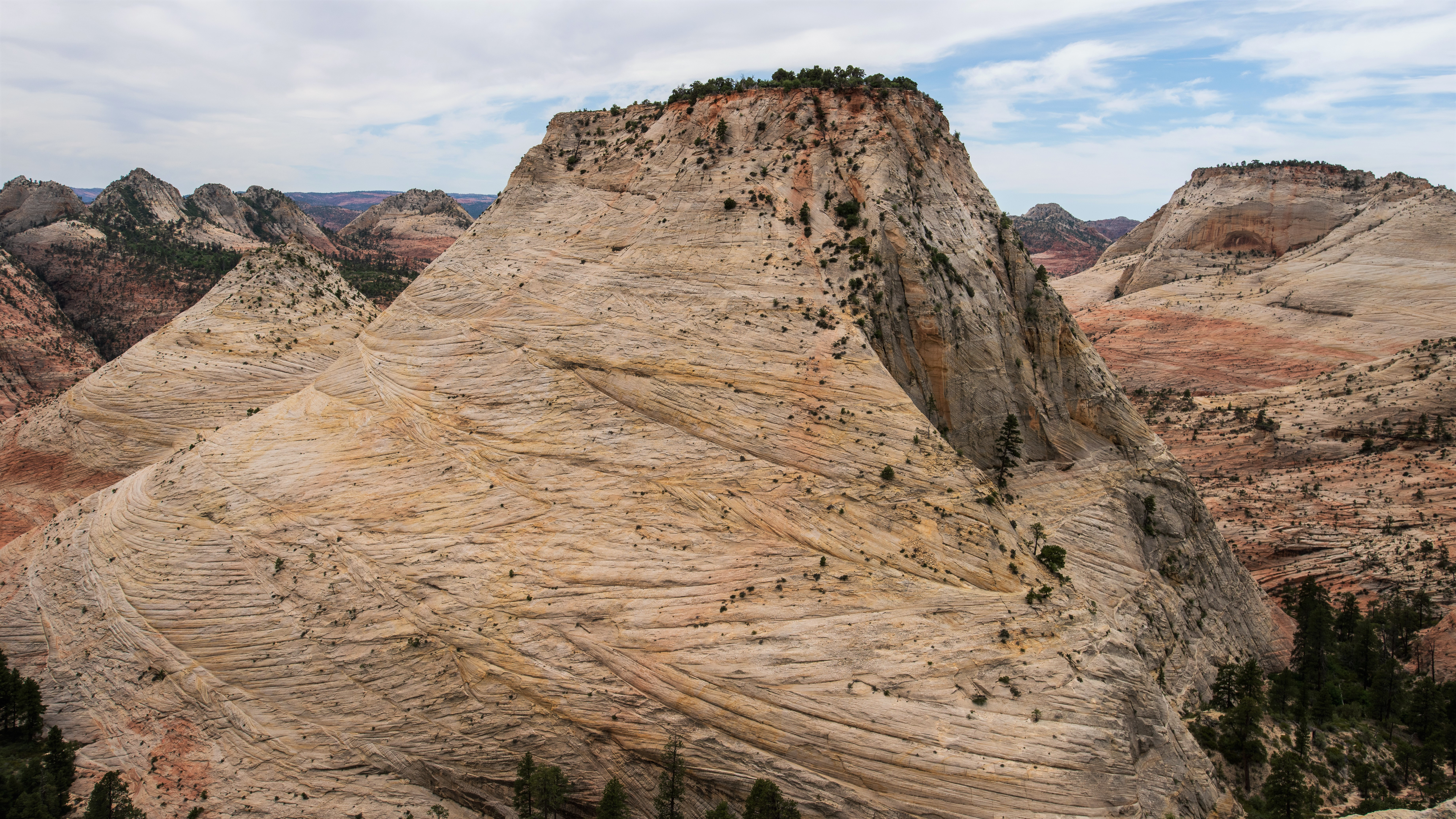
Aires Butte, north aspect; Ant Hill is to the right

== See also ==
- List of mountains in Utah
- Geology of the Zion and Kolob canyons area
- Colorado Plateau
