= List of plateaus and mesas of Utah =

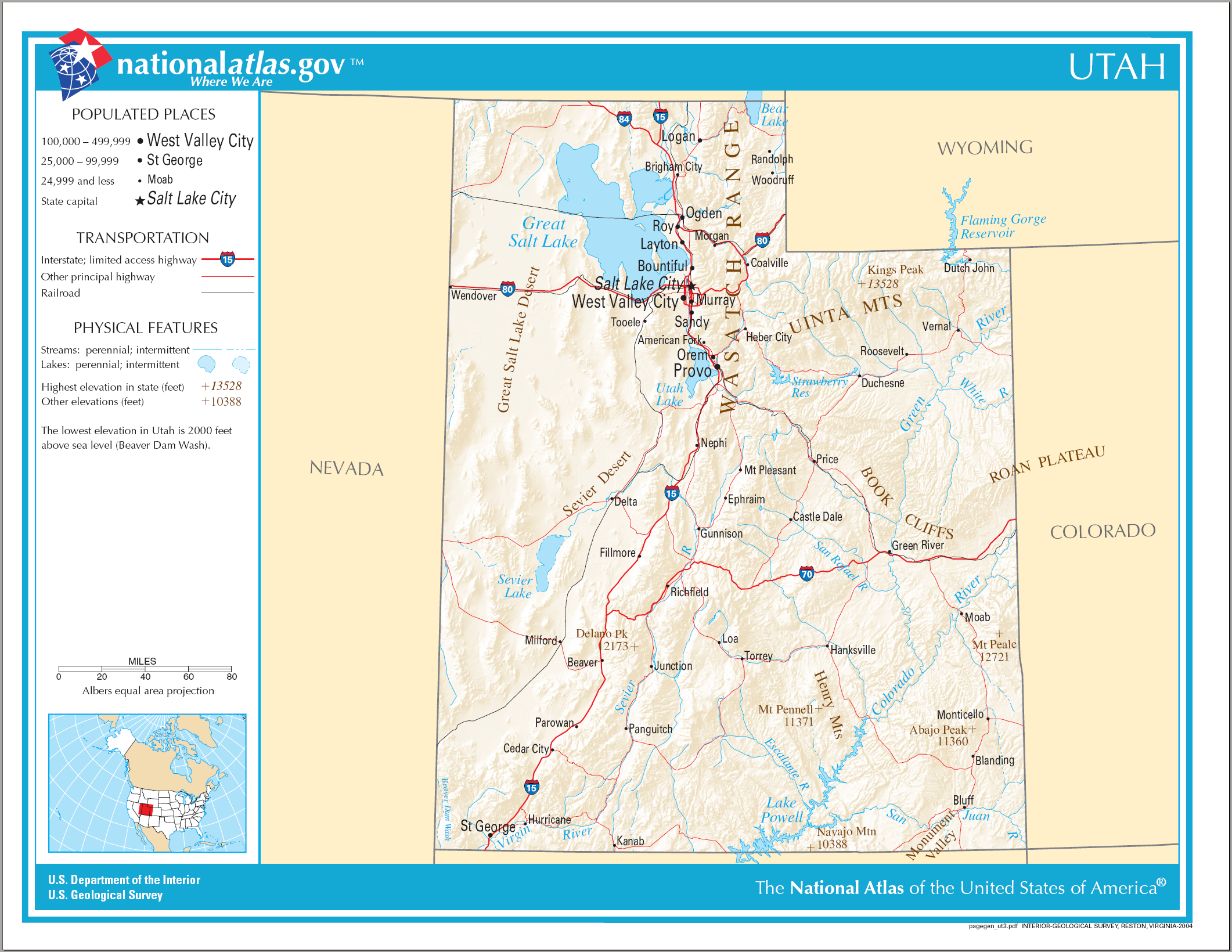
(expandable)-Map of Utah

The named plateaus and mesas of Utah.

== Carbon County ==
W

- West Tavaputs Plateau

== Emery County ==
B

- Beckwith Plateau

== Garfield County ==
A

- Aquarius Plateau

K

- Kaiparowits Plateau

M

- Markagunt Plateau

S

- Sevier Plateau

W

- Wildcat Mesa

== Grand County ==
E

- East Tavaputs Plateau

== Kane County ==
C

- Checkerboard Mesa
- Crazy Quilt Mesa

K

- Kaiparowits Plateau

== Iron County ==
M

- Markagunt Plateau

== Piute County ==
S

- Sevier Plateau

== San Juan County ==
C

- Cummings Mesa

W

- Wingate Mesa

== Sanpete County ==
W

- Wasatch Plateau

== Sevier County ==
O

- Old Woman Plateau

S

- Sevier Plateau

== Uintah County ==
D

- Diamond Mountain Plateau

E

- East Tavaputs Plateau

Y

- Yampa Plateau

== Washington County ==
H

- Hurricane Mesa

K

- Kolob Terrace

S

- Smith Mesa

== Wayne County ==
A

- Awapa Plateau

S

- Sams Mesa
- South Caineville Mesa

T

- Thompson Mesa

== See also ==
- List of mountain ranges of Utah
- List of rivers of Utah
- List of valleys of Utah
