= Crazy quilt (disambiguation) =

Crazy quilting is a quilt-making process.

Crazy quilt may also refer to:

- Crazy Quilt, a DC Comics villain
- Crazy Quilt (solitaire), a card game
- Crazy Quilt Mesa, a mountain in Utah
