= Cummings Mesa =

Summit in Utah and Arizona, United States

Coordinates: 37°0′N 111°3′W

Cummings Mesa is a summit (elevation 6,214 feet [1,894 m]) on the Navajo Nation in northern Coconino County, Arizona and southern San Juan, Utah in the western United States, about 6 miles (9.7 km) west-southwest of Navajo Mountain.

Cummings Mesa was named for Byron H. Cummings, a scientist who worked in the area.

== See also ==
- List of plateaus and mesas of Utah
