= Ant Hill (Zion National Park) =

Mountain in Utah, United States

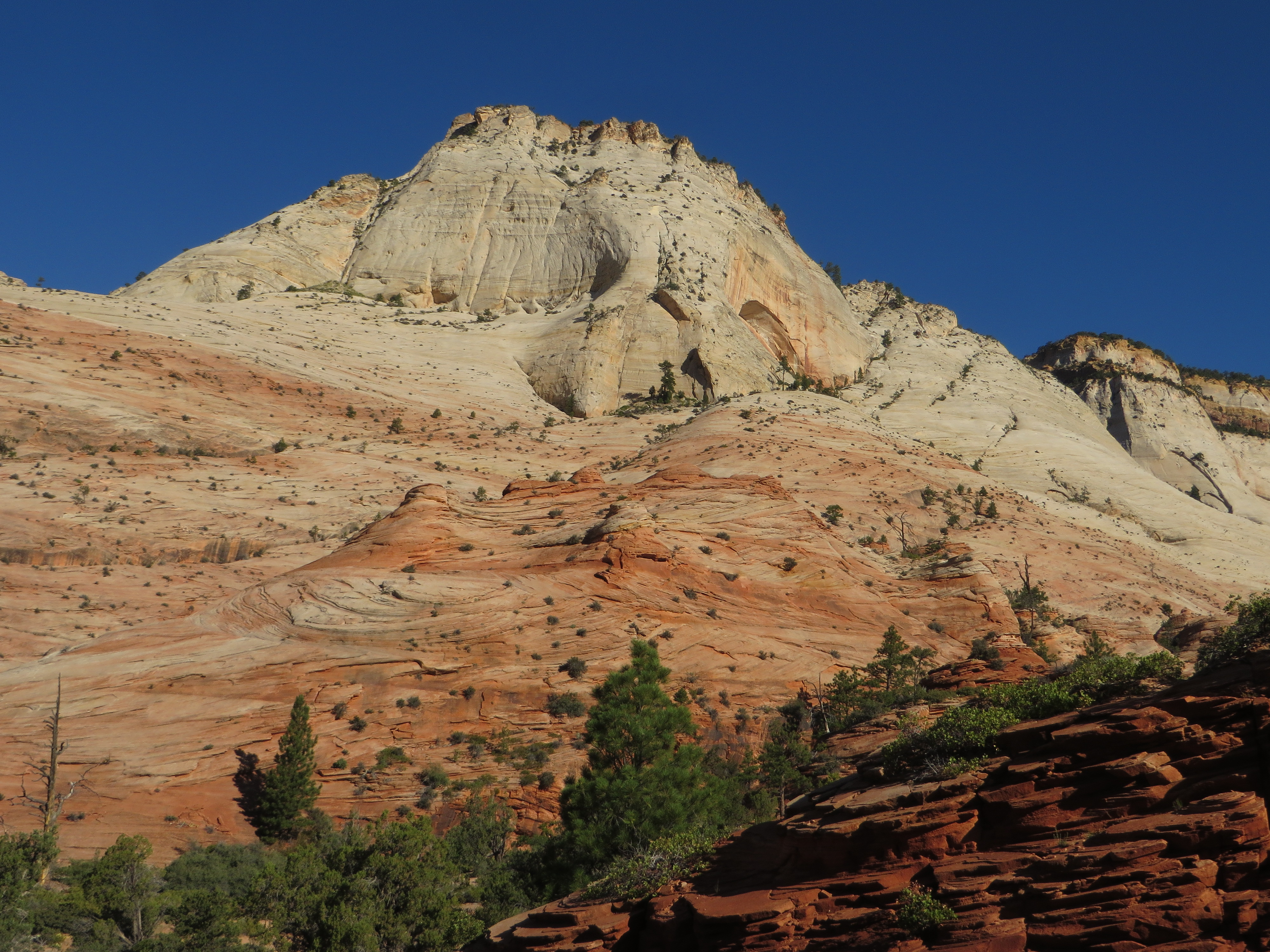
- East aspect, viewed from Highway 9

Highest point
- Elevation: 6,641 ft (2,024 m)
- Prominence: 321 ft (98 m)
- Parent peak: The Scarlet Begonia (6,995 ft)
- Isolation: 0.65 mi (1.05 km)
- Coordinates: 37°13′35″N 112°55′19″W

Geography
- Location within Utah Location within the United States
- Country: United States
- State: Utah
- County: Washington
- Protected area: Zion National Park
- Parent range: Colorado Plateau
- Topo map: USGS Springdale East

Geology
- Rock age: Jurassic
- Rock type: Navajo sandstone

Climbing
- Easiest route: class 4 scrambling

Ant Hill is a 6,641-foot (2,024 m) summit located in Zion National Park, in Washington County of southwest Utah, United States. It is composed of white Navajo Sandstone, and rises 1,400 feet (430 meters) above the Zion – Mount Carmel Highway. Ant Hill is situated 1.65 mi (2.66 km) east-northeast of The East Temple, and 2.4 mi (3.9 km) west-northwest of Checkerboard Mesa. Precipitation runoff from this mountain drains into tributaries of the Virgin River. Despite its benign name, an ascent of this mountain is a dangerous and exposed climb.

== Climate ==
Spring and fall are the most favorable seasons to visit Ant Hill. According to the Köppen climate classification system, it is located in a Cold semi-arid climate zone, which is defined by the coldest month having an average mean temperature below 32 °F (0 °C), and at least 50% of the total annual precipitation being received during the spring and summer. This desert climate receives less than 10 inches (250 millimeters) of annual rainfall, and snowfall is generally light during the winter.

== See also ==
- List of mountains in Utah
- Geology of the Zion and Kolob canyons area
- Colorado Plateau

== Gallery ==
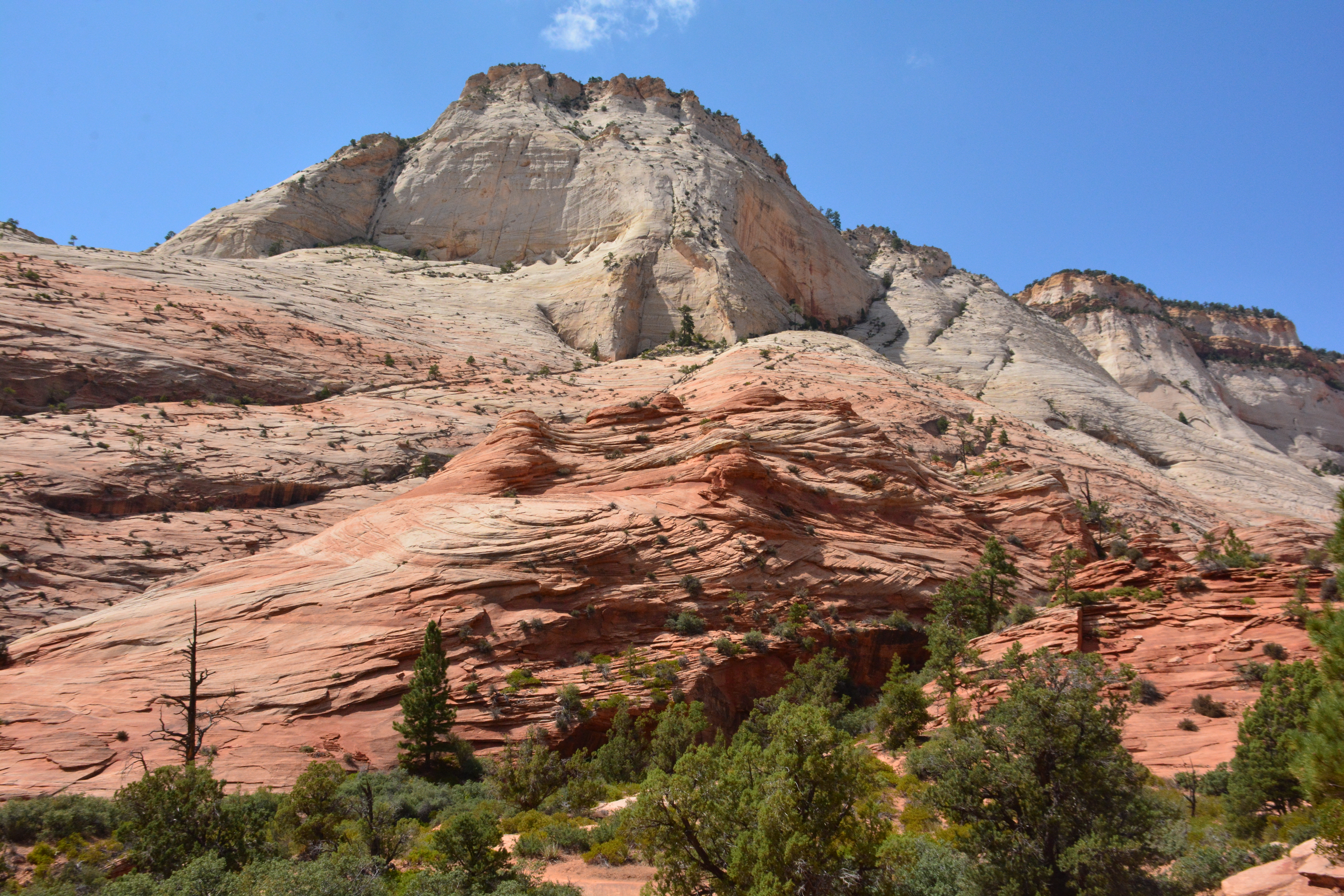

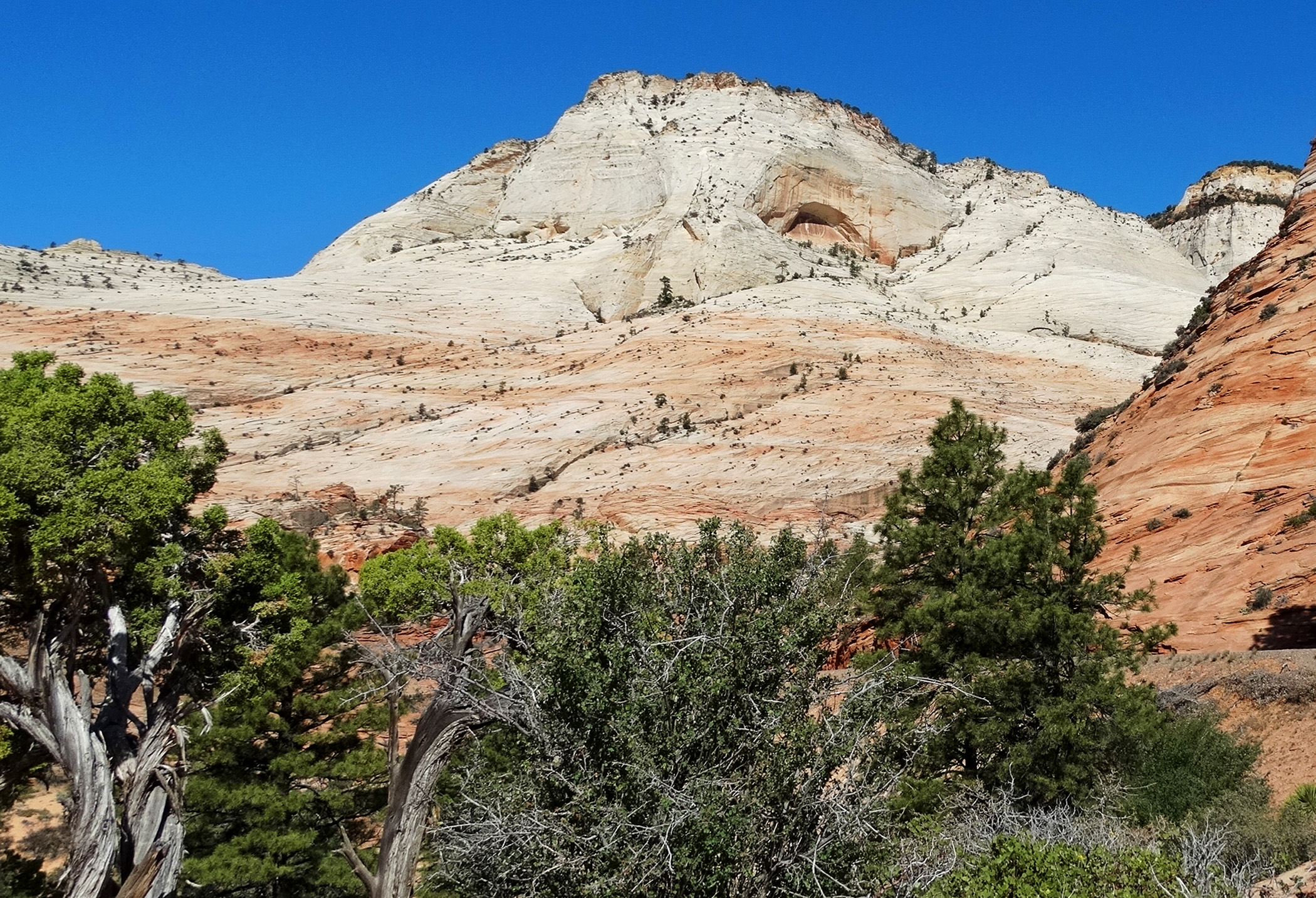

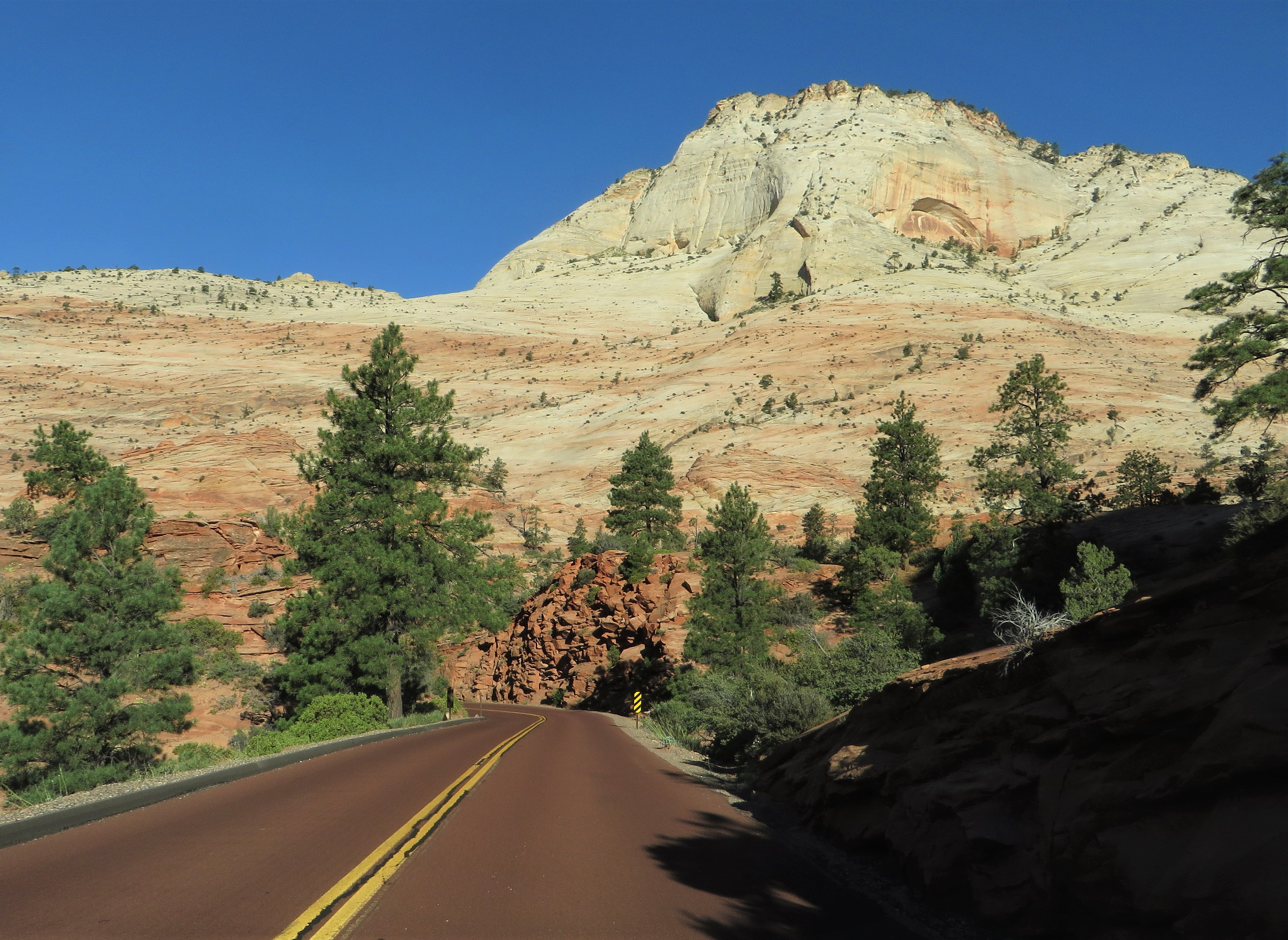

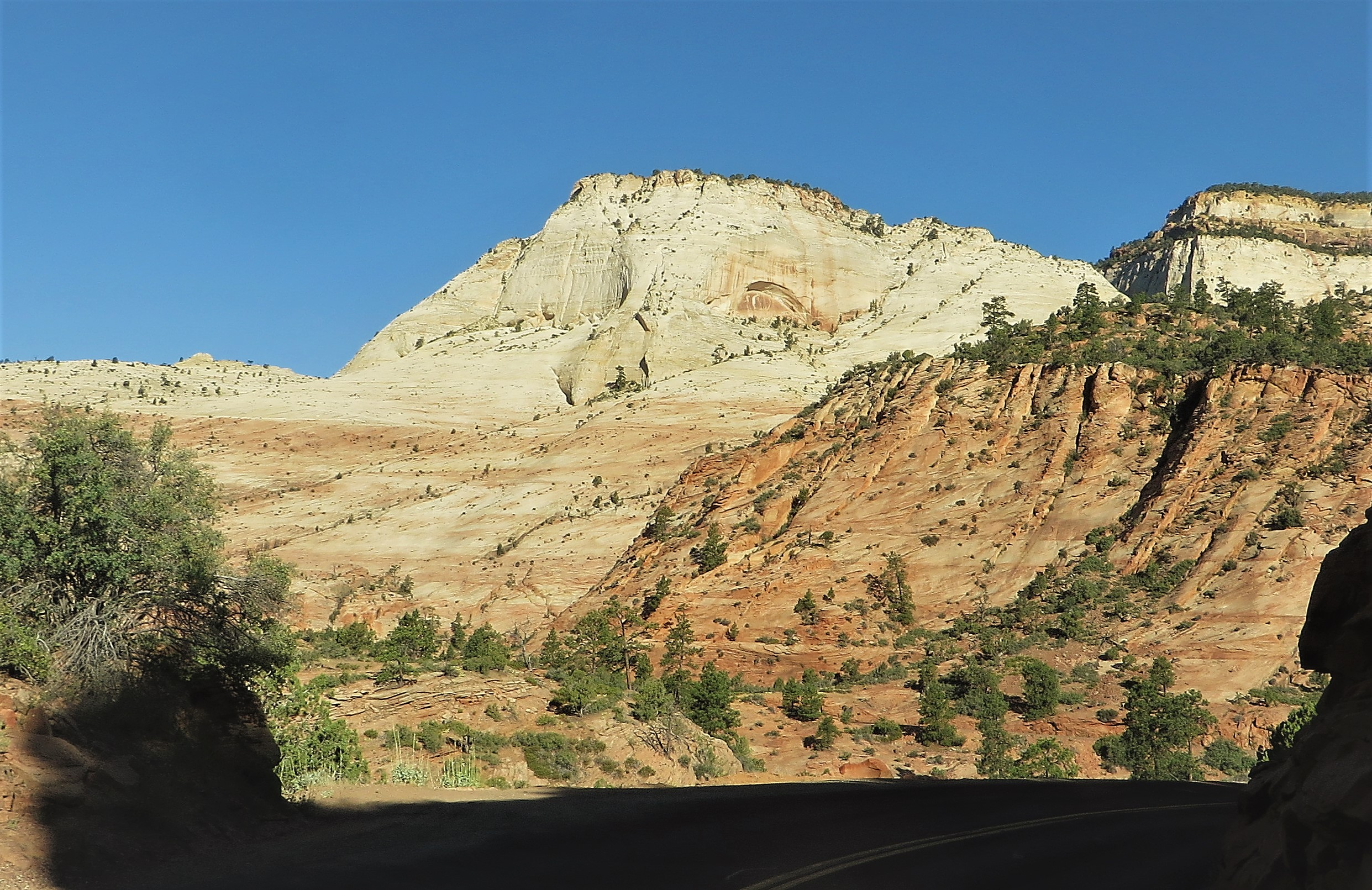

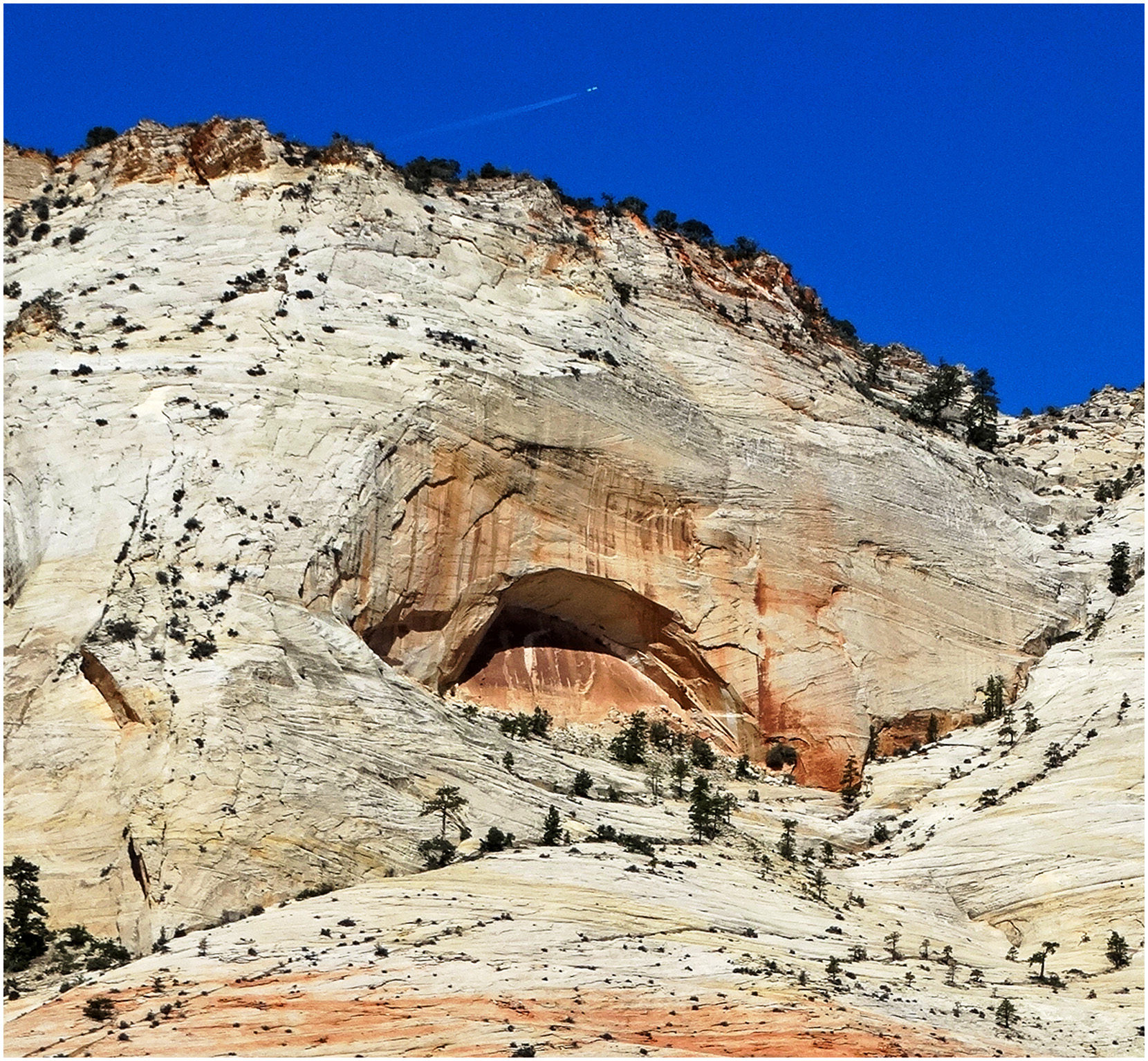

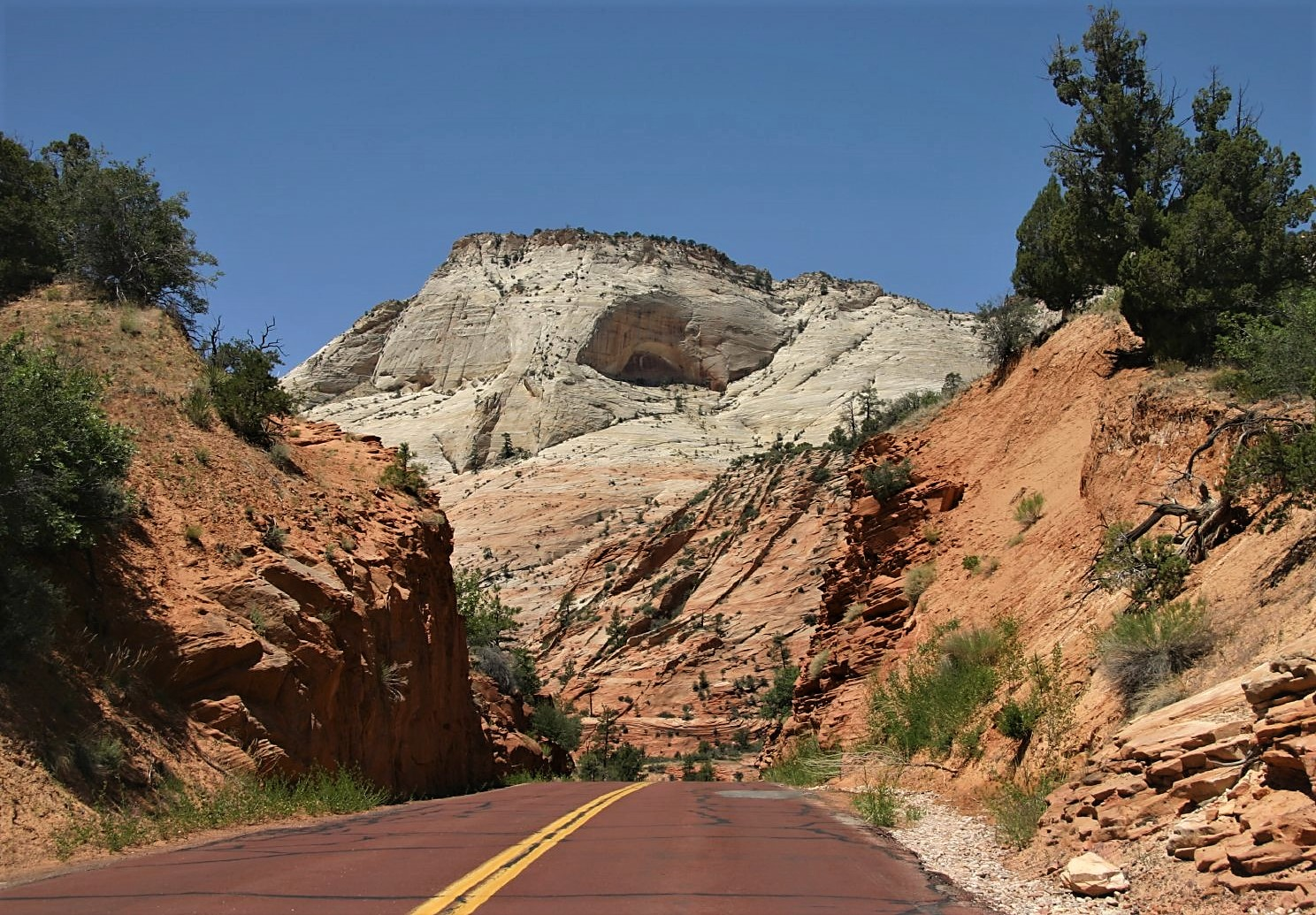

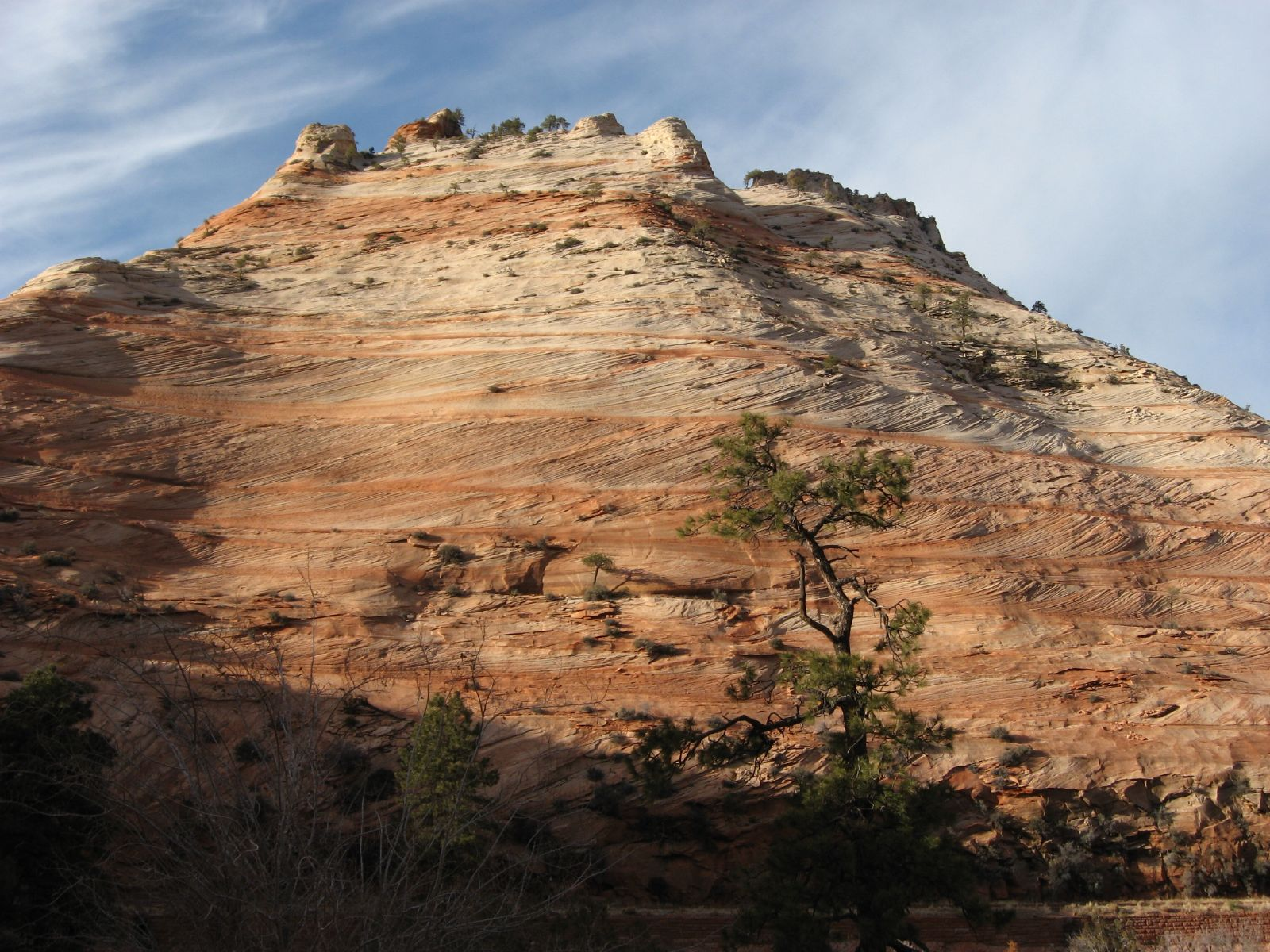
South aspect

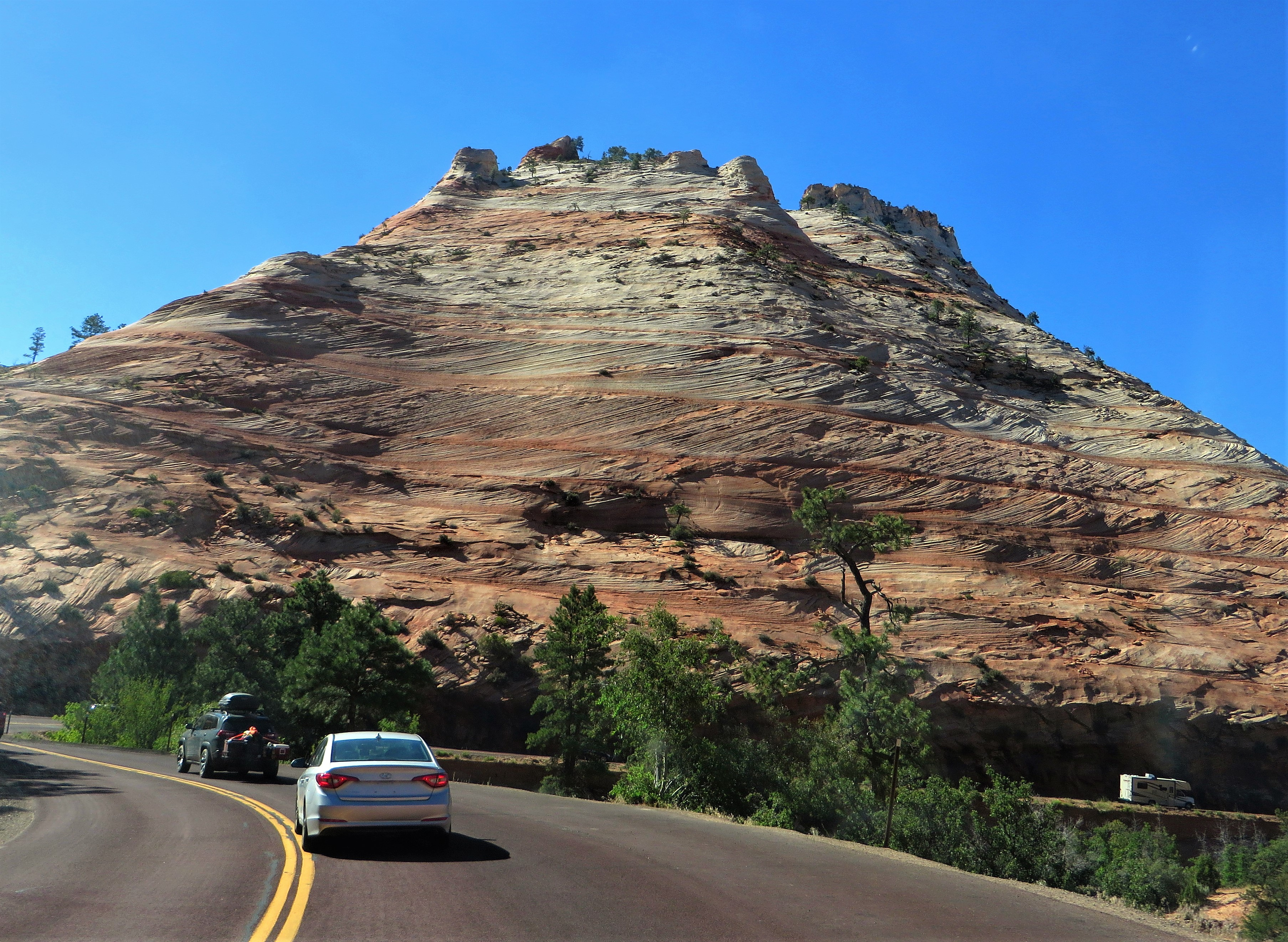
South aspect

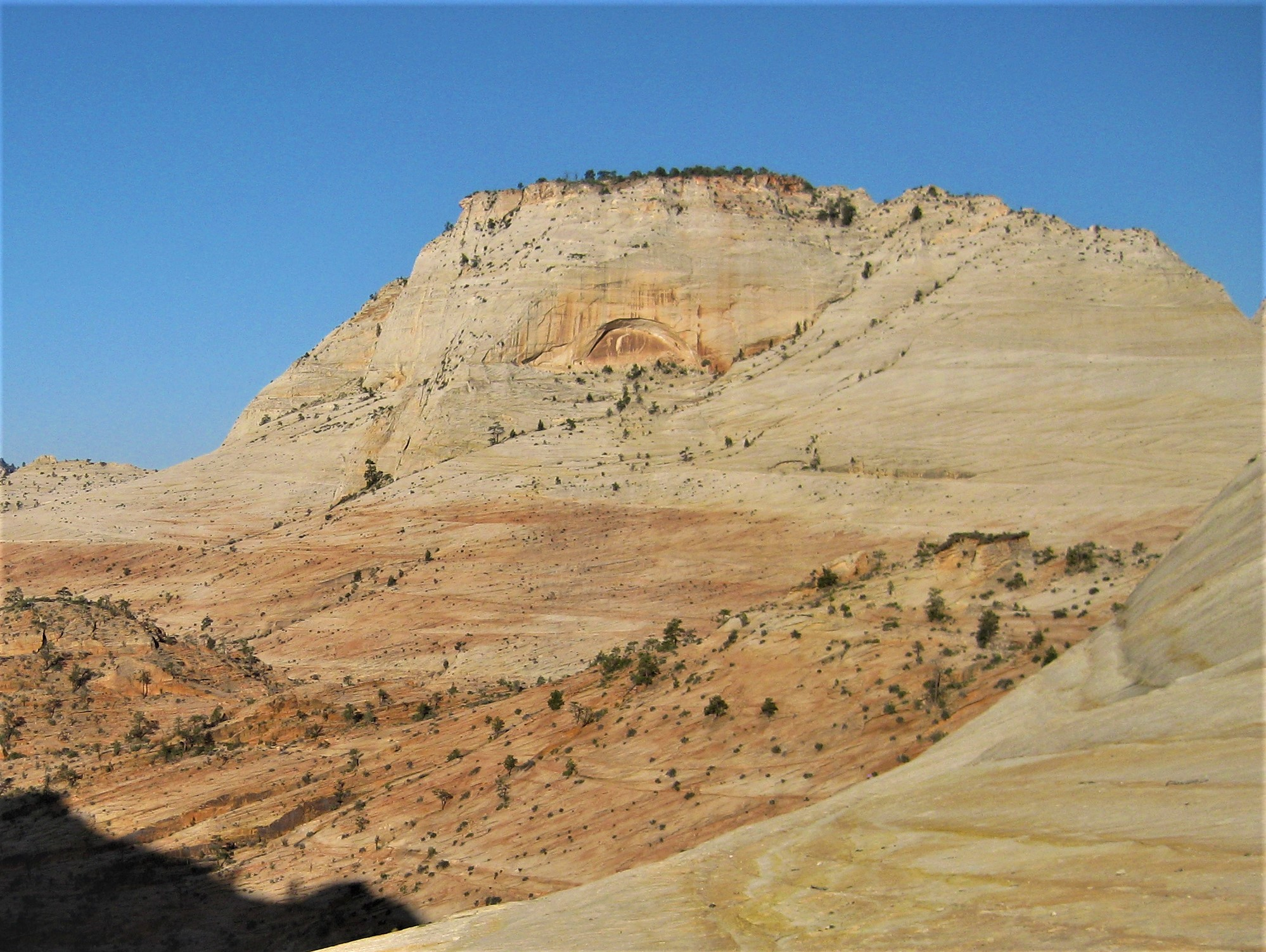
Ant Hill from ENE near Aires Butte

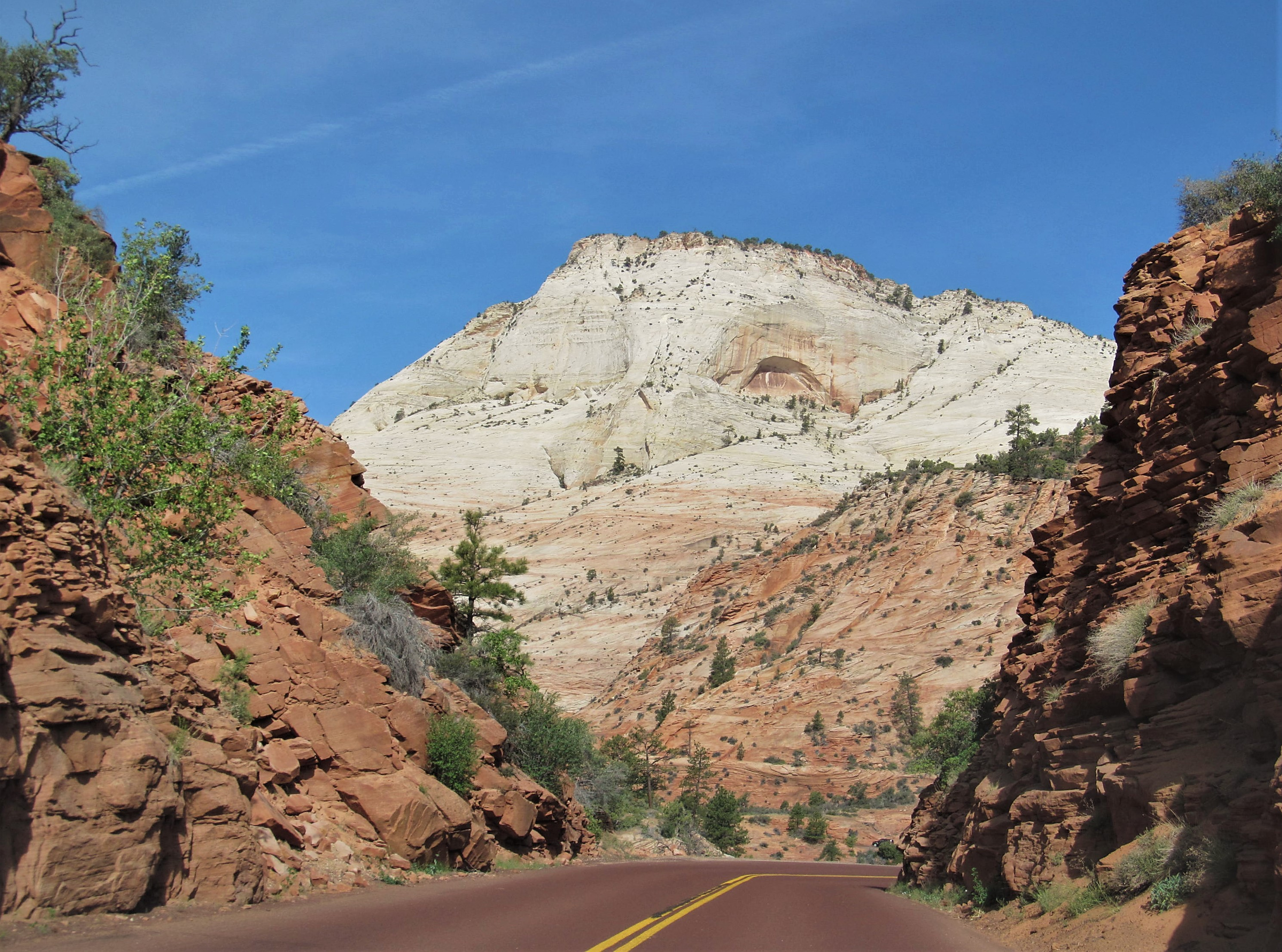

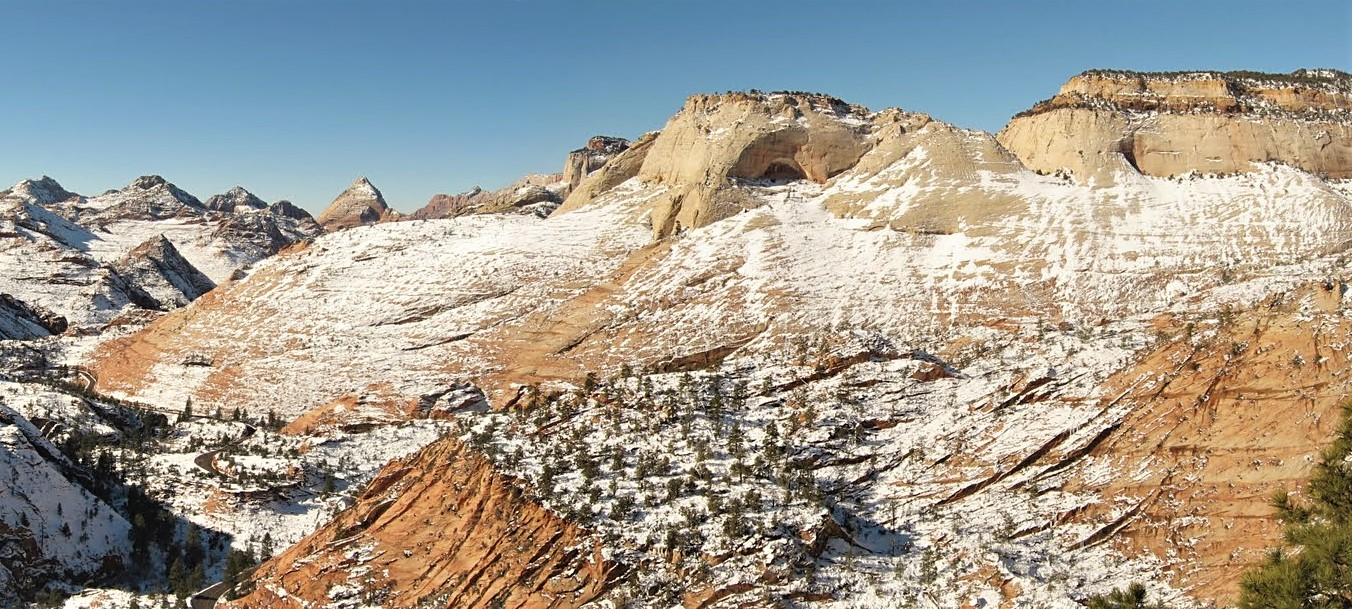
Ant Hill (center) and parent The Scarlet Begonia (upper right corner)

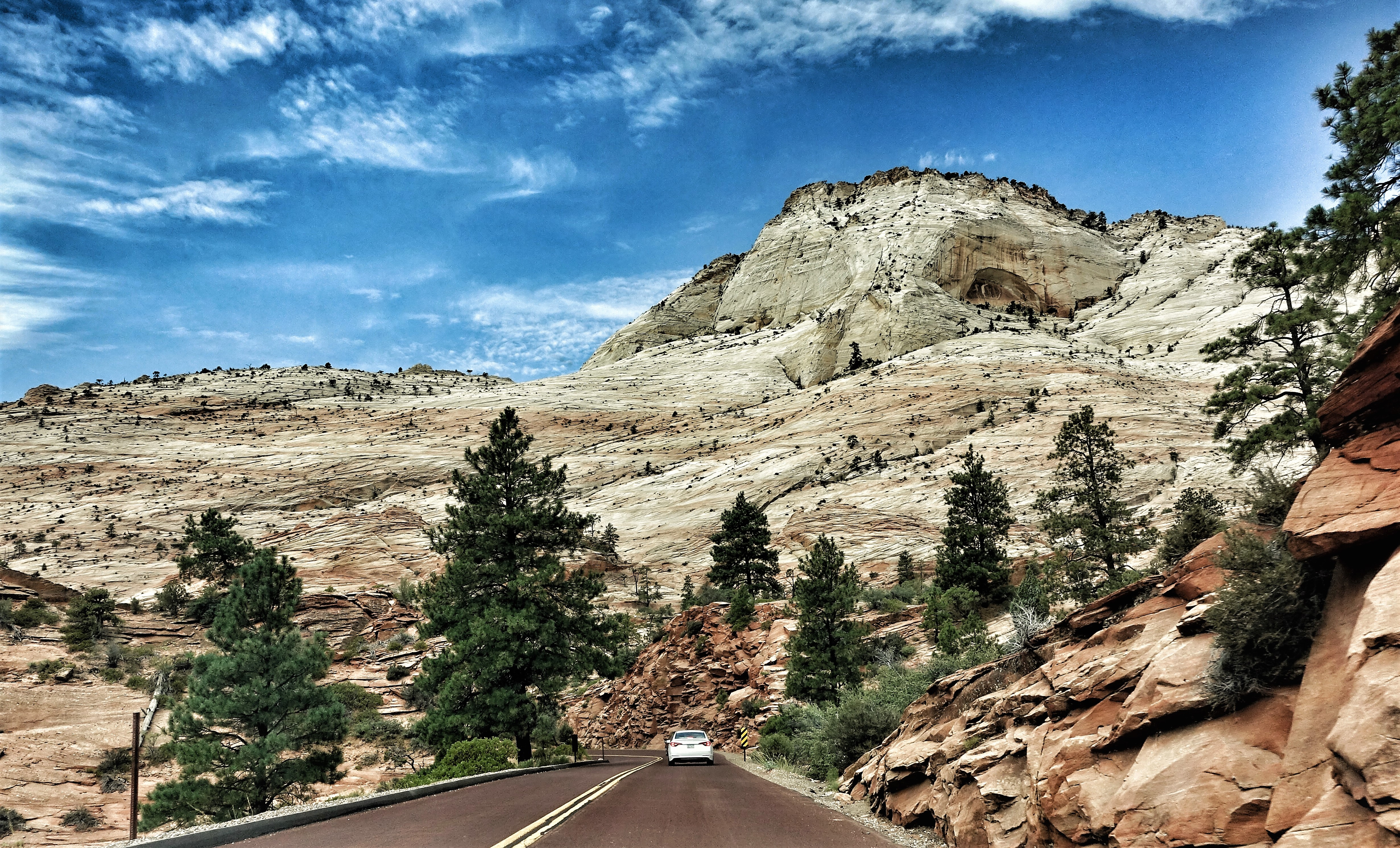
