= Crazy Quilt Mesa =

Mesa in Utah, United States

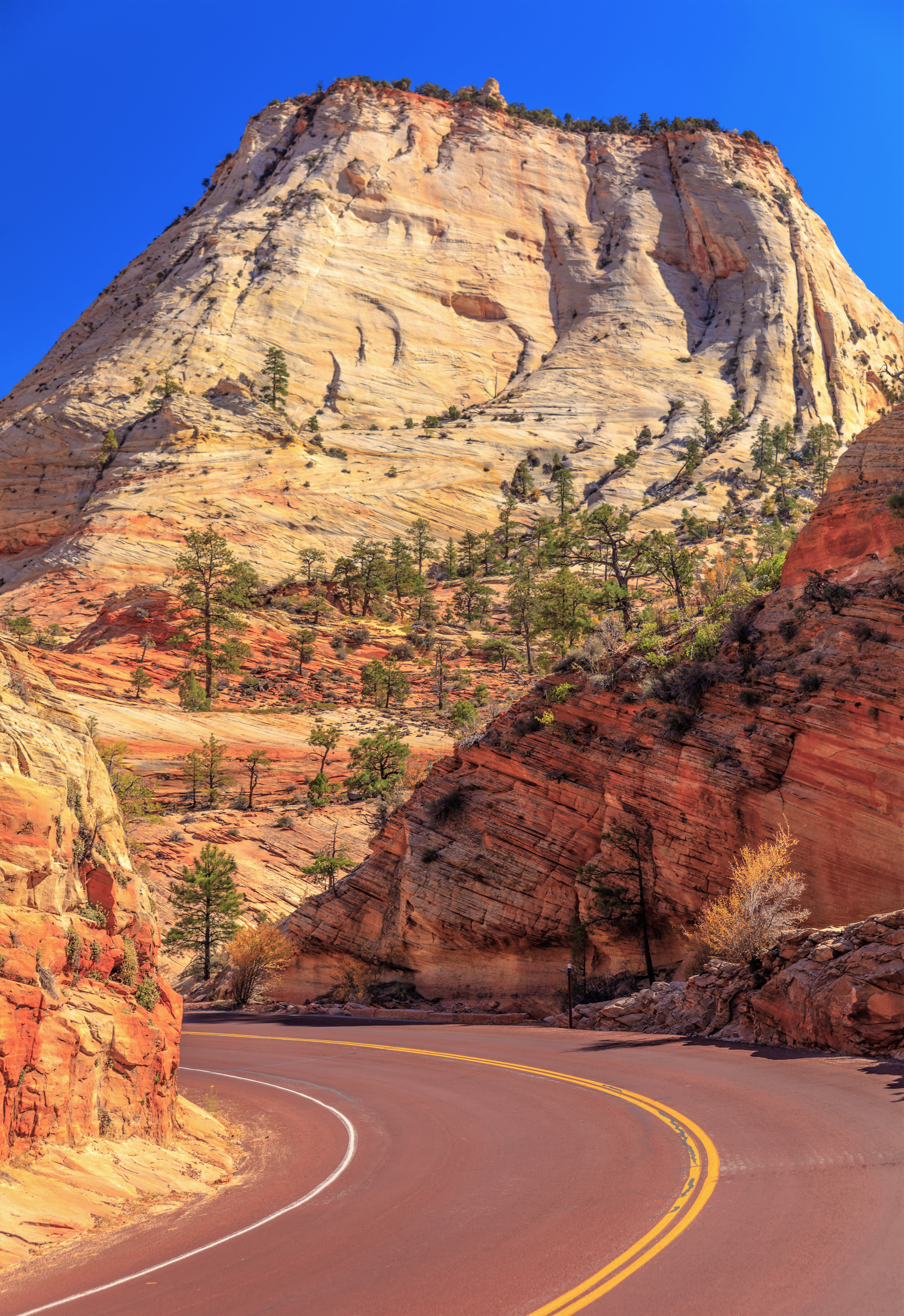
- Northwest aspect, from Zion – Mount Carmel Highway

Highest point
- Elevation: 6,760 ft (2,060 m)
- Prominence: 728 ft (222 m)
- Parent peak: Clear Creek Mountain (8,123 ft)
- Isolation: 2.56 mi (4.12 km)
- Coordinates: 37°12′43″N 112°53′20″W

Geography
- Location within Utah Location within the United States
- Country: United States
- State: Utah
- County: Kane
- Protected area: Zion National Park
- Parent range: Colorado Plateau
- Topo map: USGS Springdale East

Geology
- Rock age: Jurassic
- Rock type: Navajo sandstone

Climbing
- Easiest route: class 2+ scrambling

Crazy Quilt Mesa is a 6,760 ft (2,060 m) elevation white Navajo Sandstone summit located in Zion National Park, in Kane County of southwest Utah, United States.

== Description ==
Crazy Quilt Mesa is situated southwest of the park's east entrance, towering 1,000 feet (300 meters) above the Zion – Mount Carmel Highway. Its nearest neighbor is Checkerboard Mesa, one-half mile immediately east, and separated by Checkerboard Mesa Canyon. This canyon holds pools of rainwater which provide a vital source of water for resident bighorn sheep. Other nearby peaks include Nippletop to the west and Ant Hill to the northwest. Precipitation runoff from this mountain drains into tributaries of the Virgin River.

== Climate ==
Spring and fall are the most favorable seasons to visit Crazy Quilt Mesa. According to the Köppen climate classification system, it is located in a Cold semi-arid climate zone, which is defined by the coldest month having an average mean temperature below 32 °F (0 °C), and at least 50% of the total annual precipitation being received during the spring and summer. This desert climate receives less than 10 inches (250 millimeters) of annual rainfall, and snowfall is generally light during the winter.

== See also ==
- List of mountains of Utah
- Geology of the Zion and Kolob canyons area
- Colorado Plateau

== Gallery ==
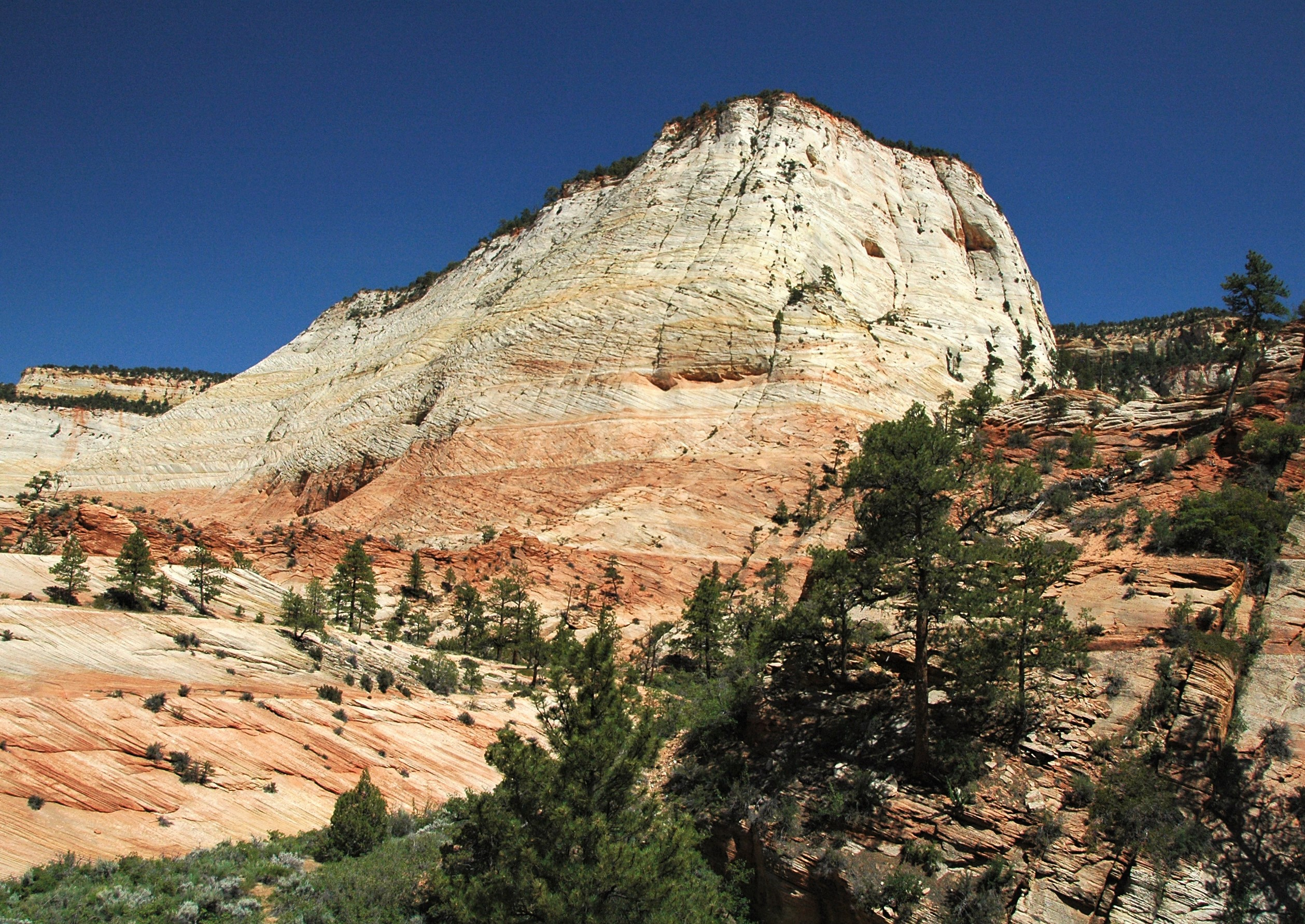

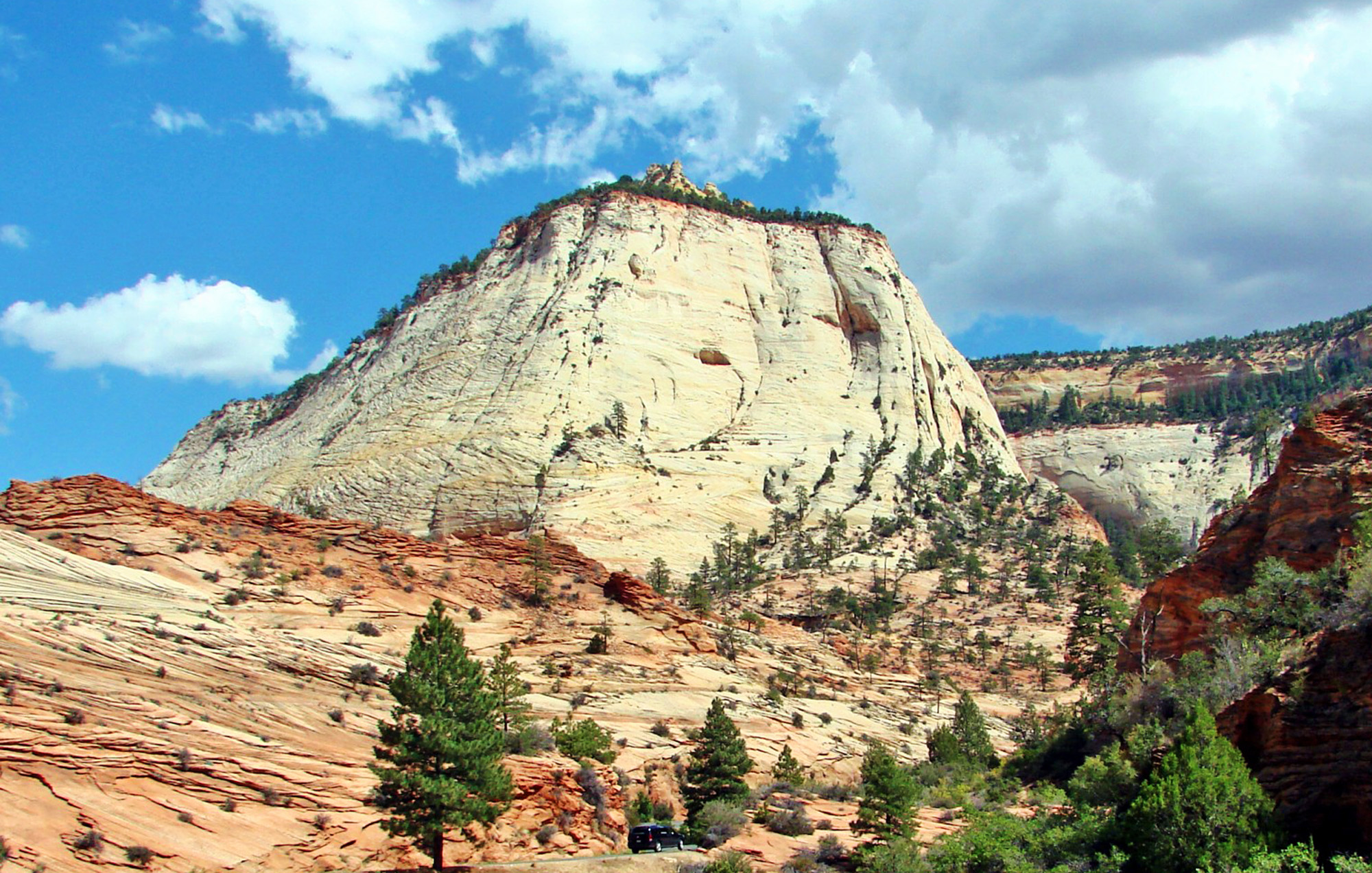

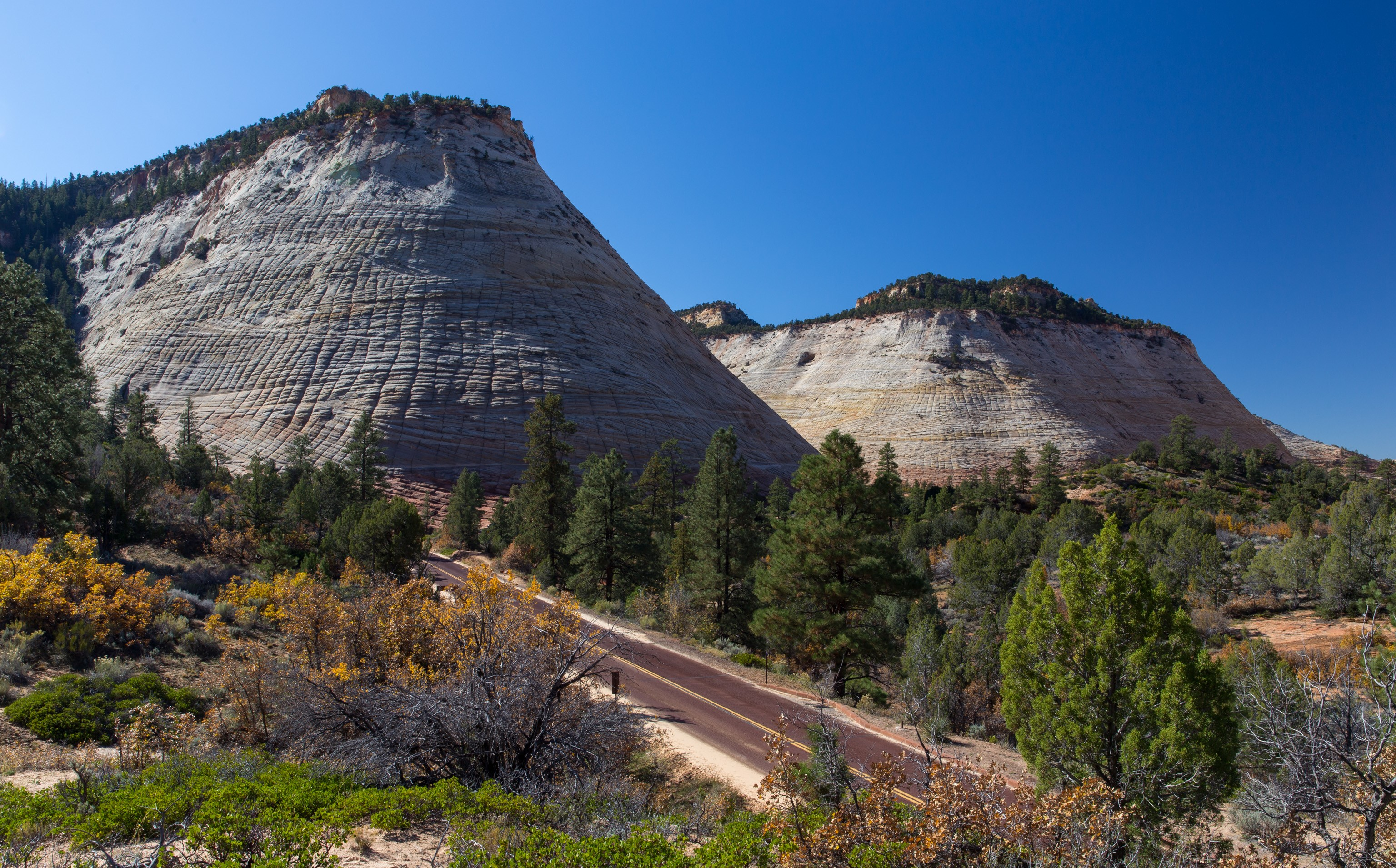
Checkerboard Mesa (left) and Crazy Quilt Mesa (right) from northeast

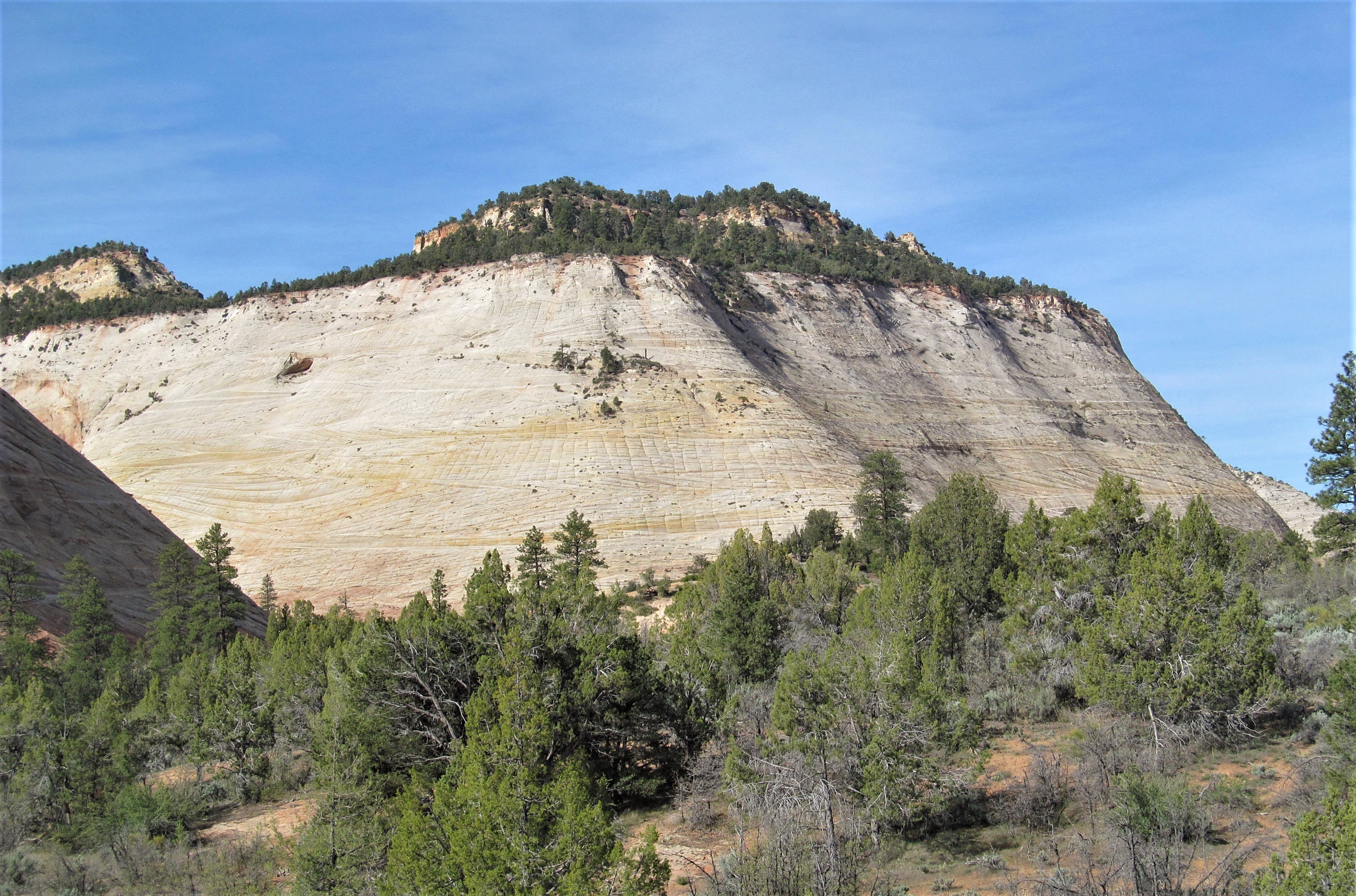
Northeast aspect
