= Nippletop (Zion) =

Mountain in Zion National Park

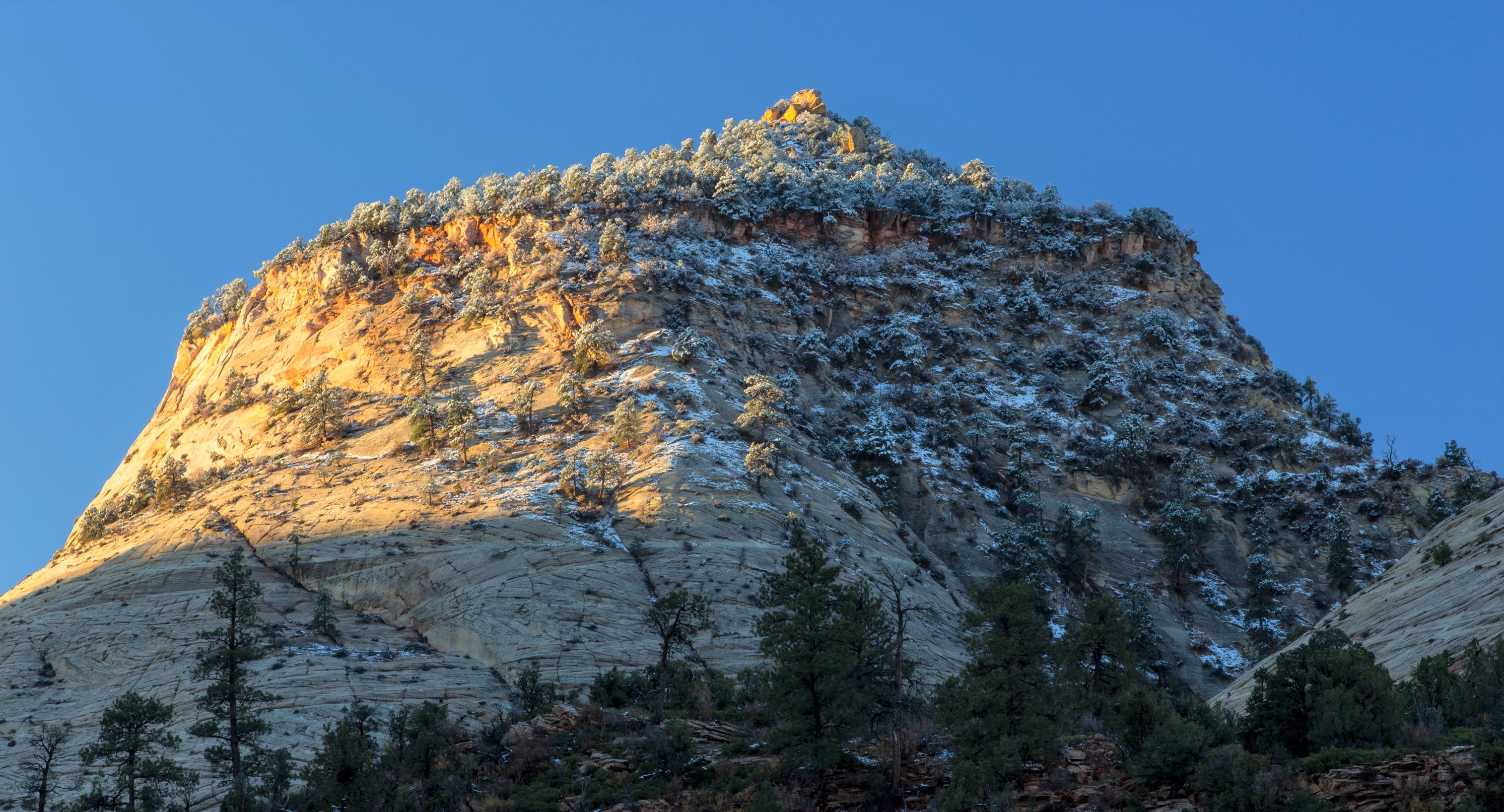
- North-northeast aspect, from Zion – Mount Carmel Highway

Highest point
- Elevation: 6,715 ft (2,047 m)
- Prominence: 795 ft (242 m)
- Parent peak: Crazy Quilt Mesa (6,760 ft)
- Isolation: 0.74 mi (1.19 km)
- Coordinates: 37°12′39″N 112°54′08″W

Geography
- Location within Utah Location within the United States
- Country: United States
- State: Utah
- County: Washington
- Protected area: Zion National Park
- Parent range: Colorado Plateau
- Topo map: USGS Springdale East

Geology
- Rock age: Jurassic
- Rock type: Navajo sandstone

Climbing
- Easiest route: class 2+ scrambling

Nippletop is a 6,715-foot (2,047-meter) elevation white Navajo Sandstone summit located in Zion National Park, in Washington County of southwest Utah, United States. Nippletop is situated one mile immediately west of Crazy Quilt Mesa, and one mile south of the Zion – Mount Carmel Highway, towering 1,200 feet (370 meters) above it. Precipitation runoff from this unofficially named mountain drains into tributaries of the Virgin River.

== Climate ==
Spring and fall are the most favorable seasons to visit Nippletop. According to the Köppen climate classification system, it is located in a Cold semi-arid climate zone, which is defined by the coldest month having an average mean temperature below 32 °F (0 °C), and at least 50% of the total annual precipitation being received during the spring and summer. This desert climate receives less than 10 inches (250 millimeters) of annual rainfall, and snowfall is generally light during the winter.

== See also ==
- Geology of the Zion and Kolob canyons area
- Colorado Plateau

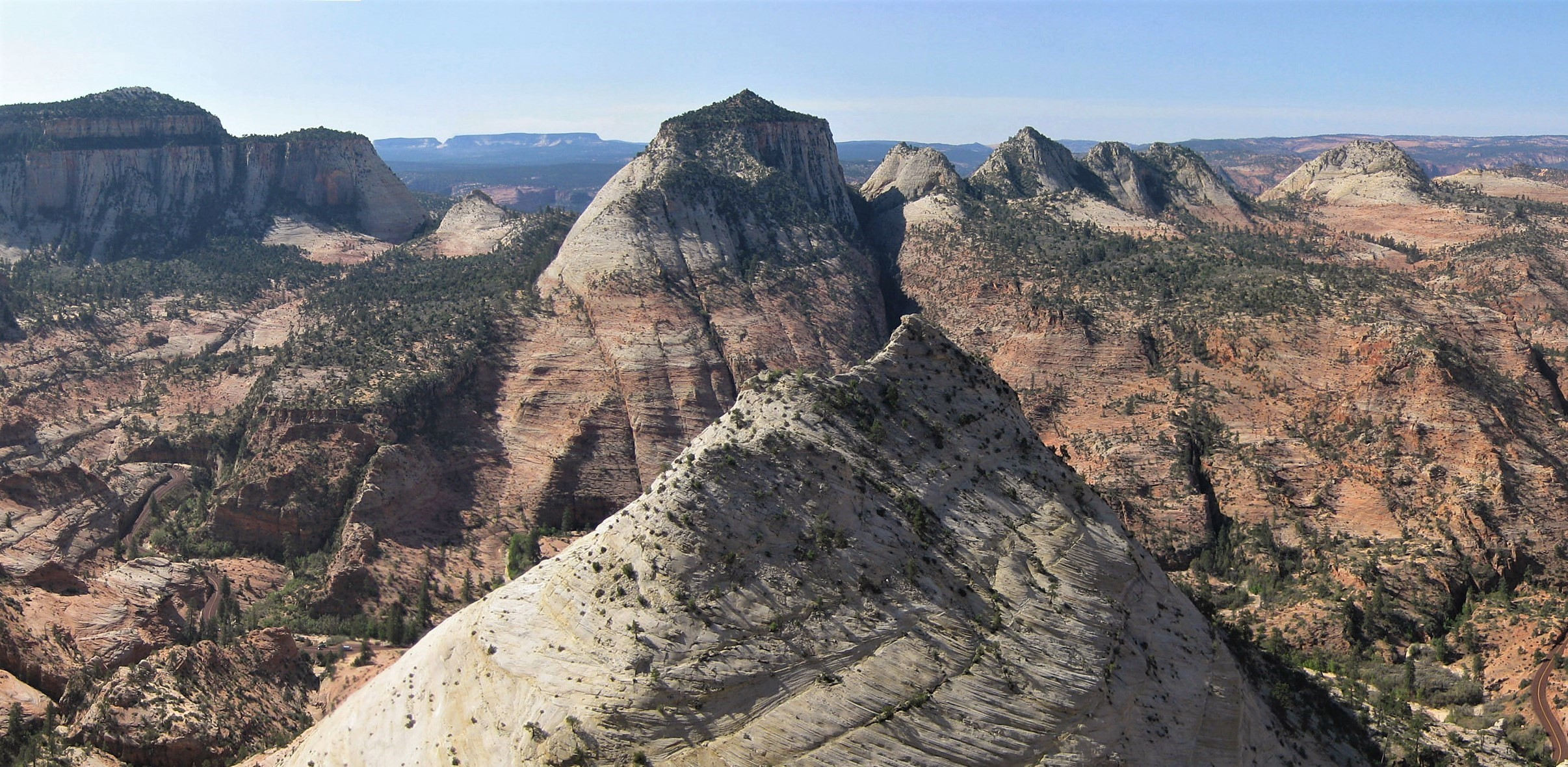
Nippletop from north, near the top of Aries Butte. Crazy Quilt Mesa upper left corner, South Ariel Butte in foreground, Zion – Mount Carmel Highway in lower right corner.
