= Checkerboard Mesa =

Mesa in Utah, United States

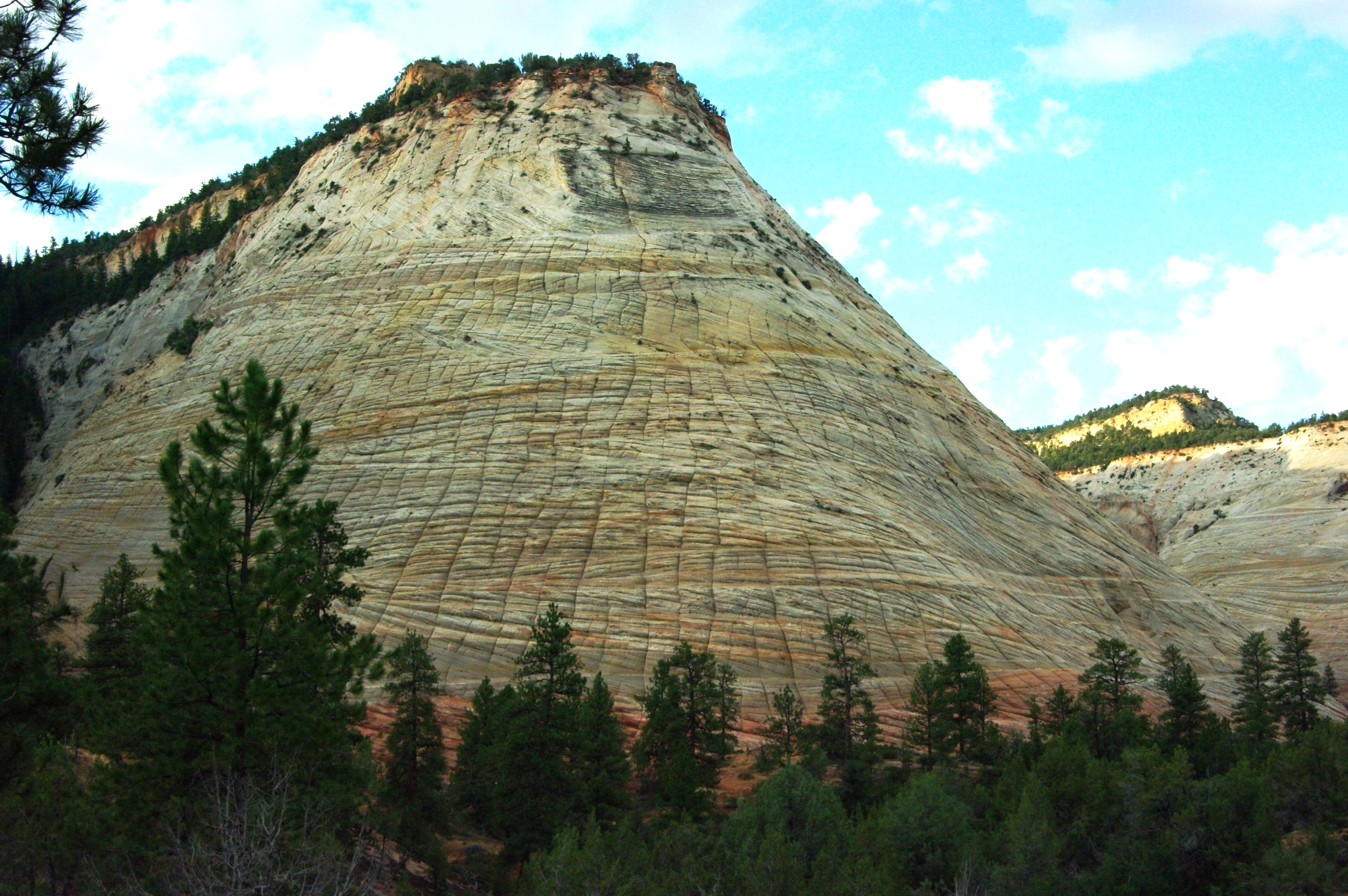
- North aspect, viewed from Highway 9

Highest point
- Elevation: 6,520 ft (1,990 m)
- Prominence: 520 ft (160 m)
- Parent peak: Crazy Quilt Mesa (6,760 ft)
- Isolation: 0.55 mi (0.89 km)
- Coordinates: 37°12′56″N 112°52′49″W

Geography
- Location within Utah Location within the United States
- Country: United States
- State: Utah
- County: Kane
- Protected area: Zion National Park
- Parent range: Colorado Plateau
- Topo map: USGS Springdale East

Geology
- Rock age: Jurassic
- Rock type: Navajo sandstone

Climbing
- Easiest route: class 2 scrambling

Checkerboard Mesa is an iconic 6,520+ ft (1,990+ m) elevation Navajo Sandstone summit located in Zion National Park, in Kane County of southwest Utah, United States. Checkerboard Mesa is situated immediately southwest of the park's east entrance, towering 900 feet (270 meters) above the Zion – Mount Carmel Highway. Its nearest neighbor is Crazy Quilt Mesa, one-half mile immediately west, and separated by Checkerboard Mesa Canyon. This canyon holds pools of rainwater which provide a vital source of water for resident bighorn sheep. This peak was originally named Checkerboard Mountain by the park's third superintendent, Preston P. Patraw. The landform's toponym was officially adopted in 1935 by the U.S. Board on Geographic Names. The descriptive name stems from the cliff's distinctive multitudinous check lines in cross-bedded white sandstone which give the impression of a checkerboard. The horizontal lines are caused by cross-bedding, a remnant of ancient sand dunes. The vertical and sub-vertical lines formed by the contraction and expansion of the sandstone caused by temperature changes, freezing and thawing cycles, in combination with wetting and drying. Precipitation runoff from this mountain drains into tributaries of the Virgin River.

== Climate ==
Spring and fall are the most favorable seasons to visit Checkerboard Mesa. According to the Köppen climate classification system, it is located in a Cold semi-arid climate zone, which is defined by the coldest month having an average mean temperature below 32 °F (0 °C), and at least 50% of the total annual precipitation being received during the spring and summer. This desert climate receives less than 10 inches (250 millimeters) of annual rainfall, and snowfall is generally light during the winter.

== See also ==
- Geology of the Zion and Kolob canyons area
- Colorado Plateau

== Gallery ==
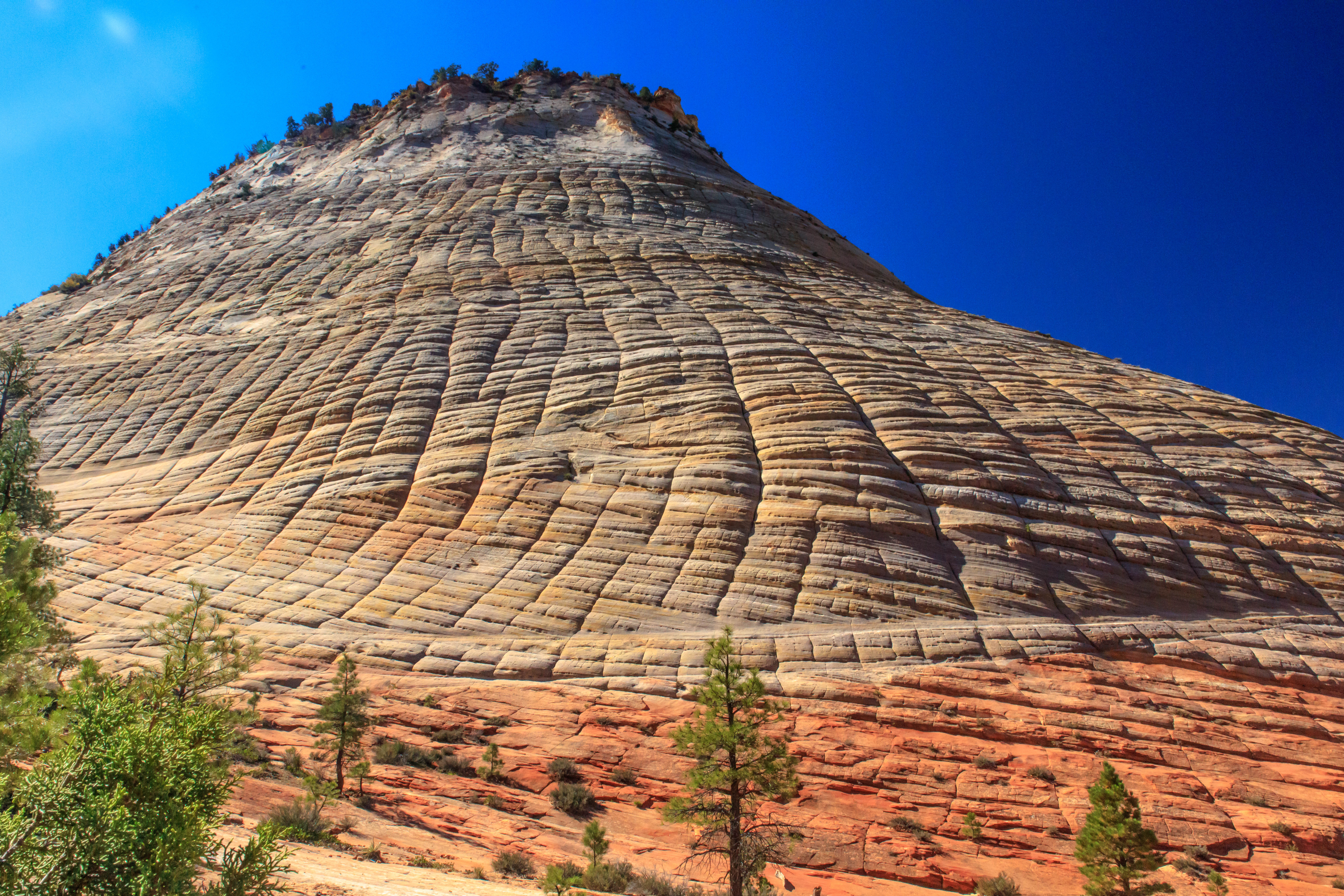
Checkerboard Mesa detail

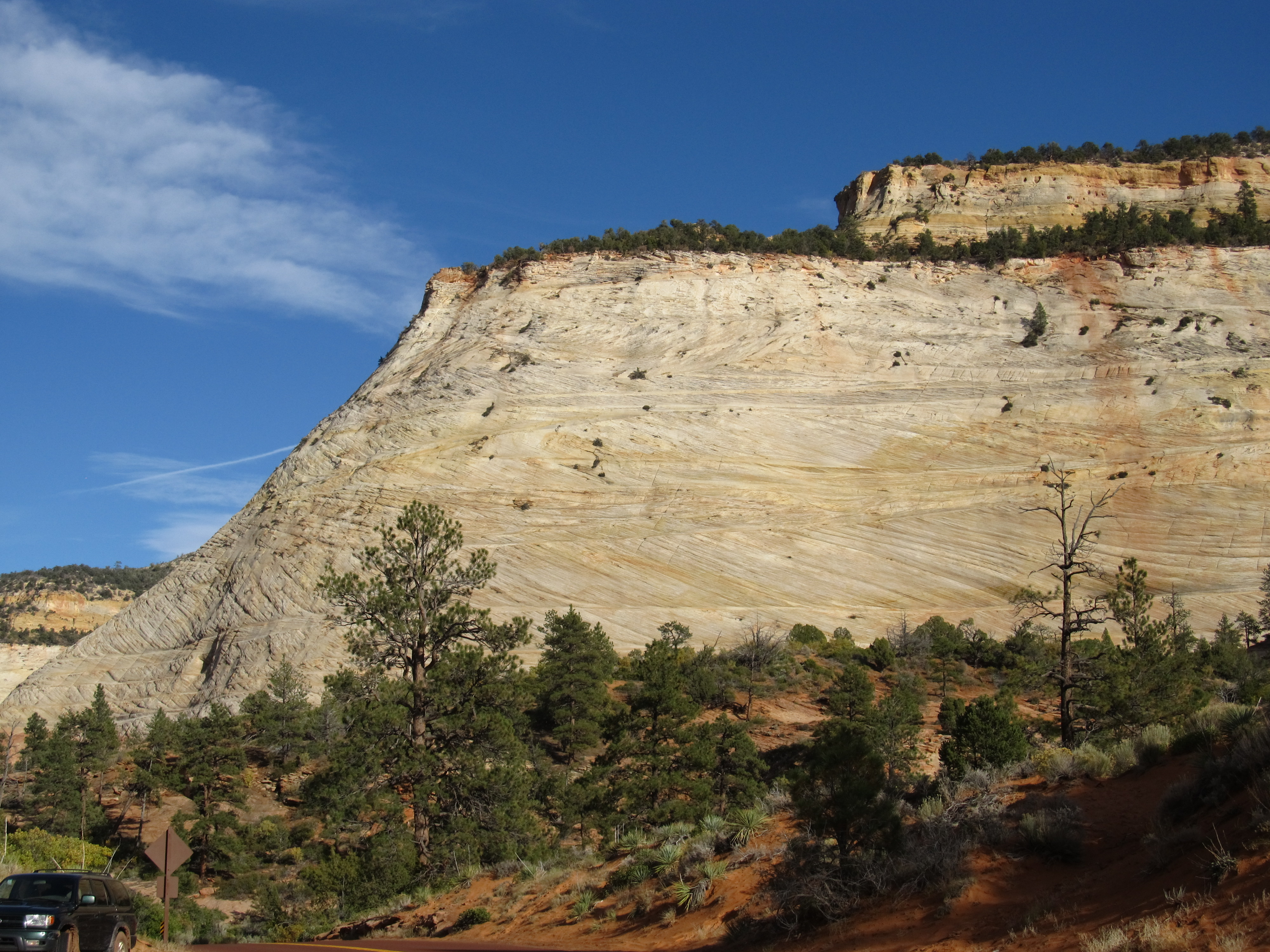
West aspect, viewed from Highway 9

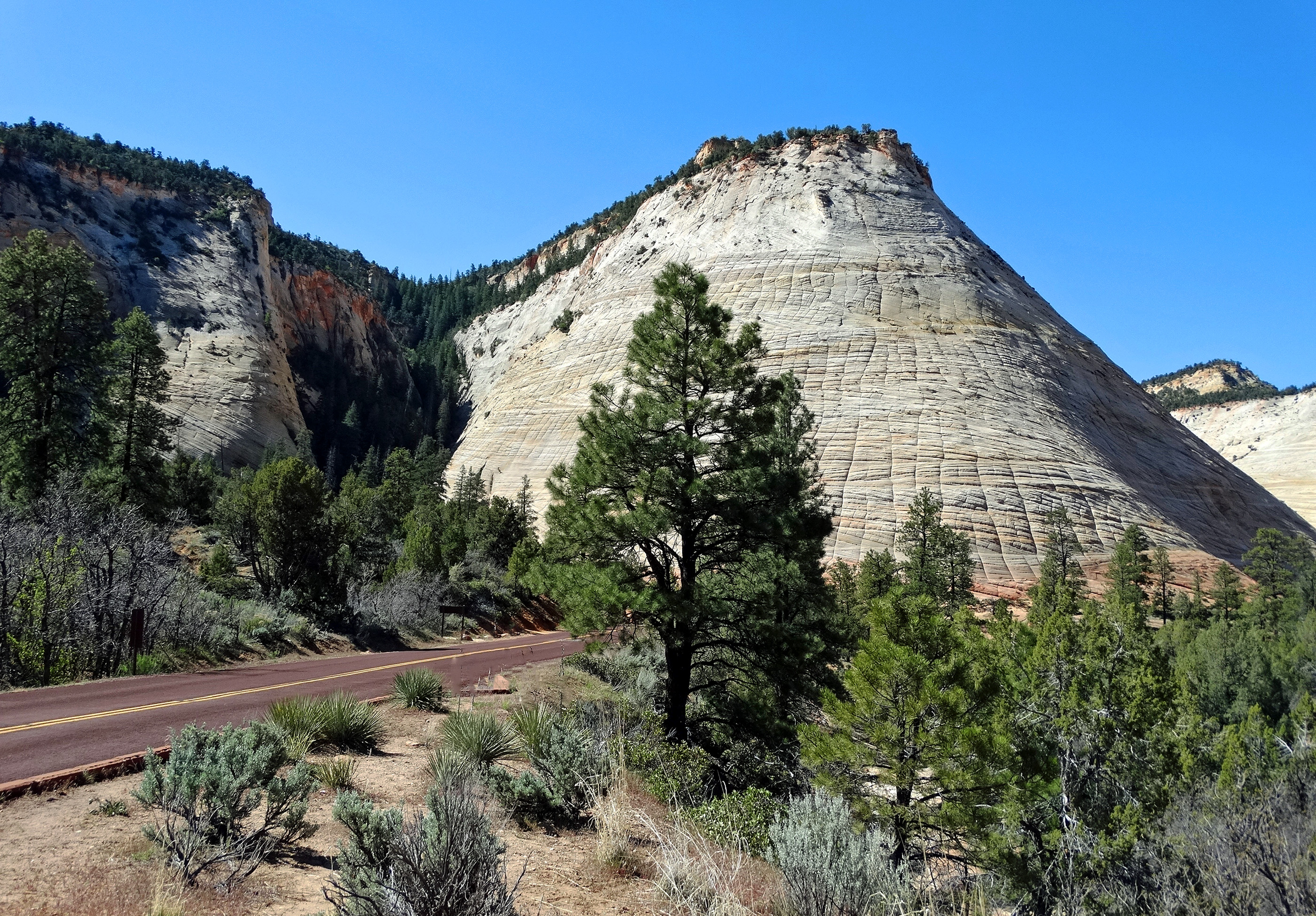

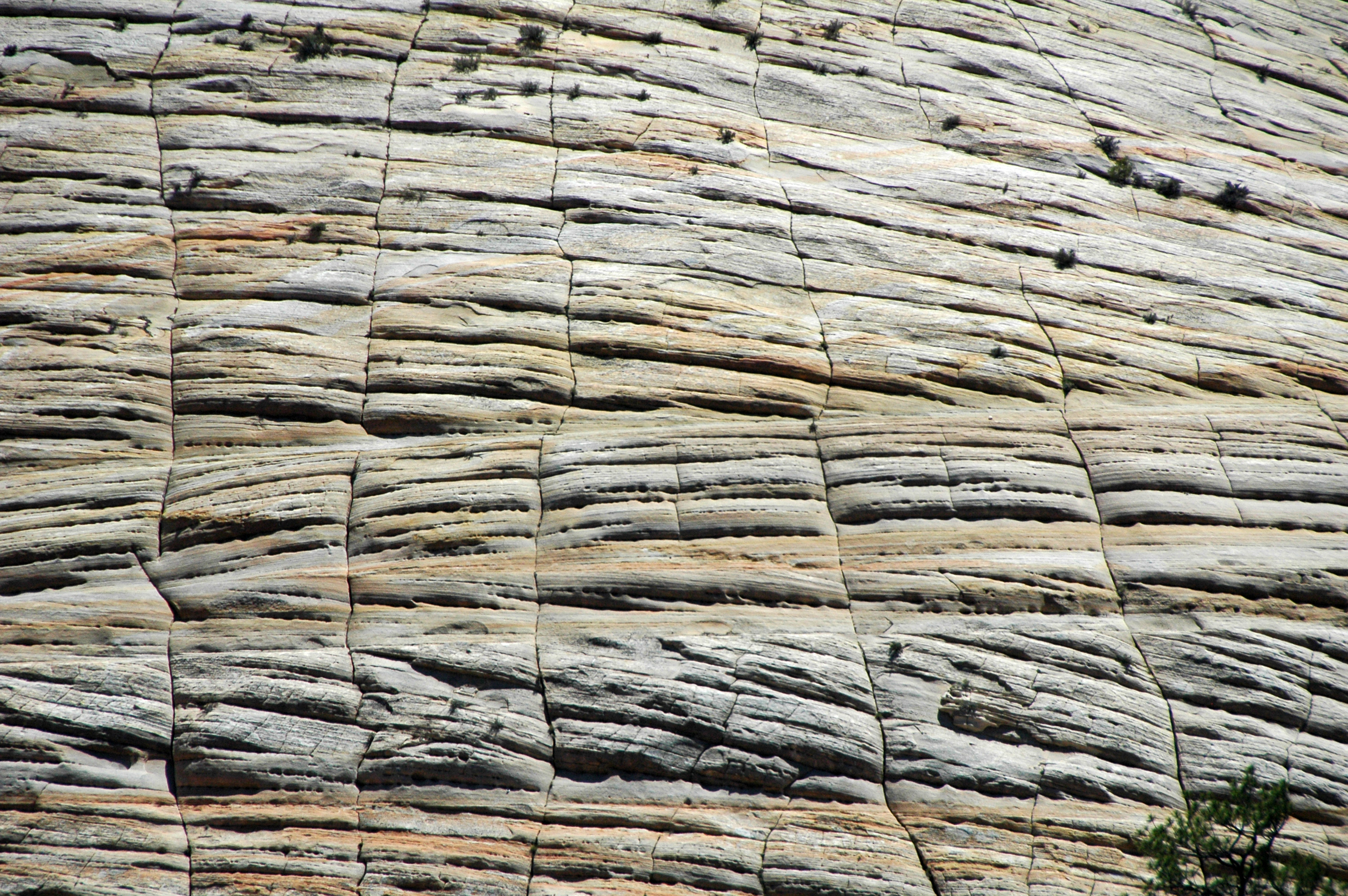
Cross-bedded Navajo Sandstone with subvertical expansion-contraction cracks

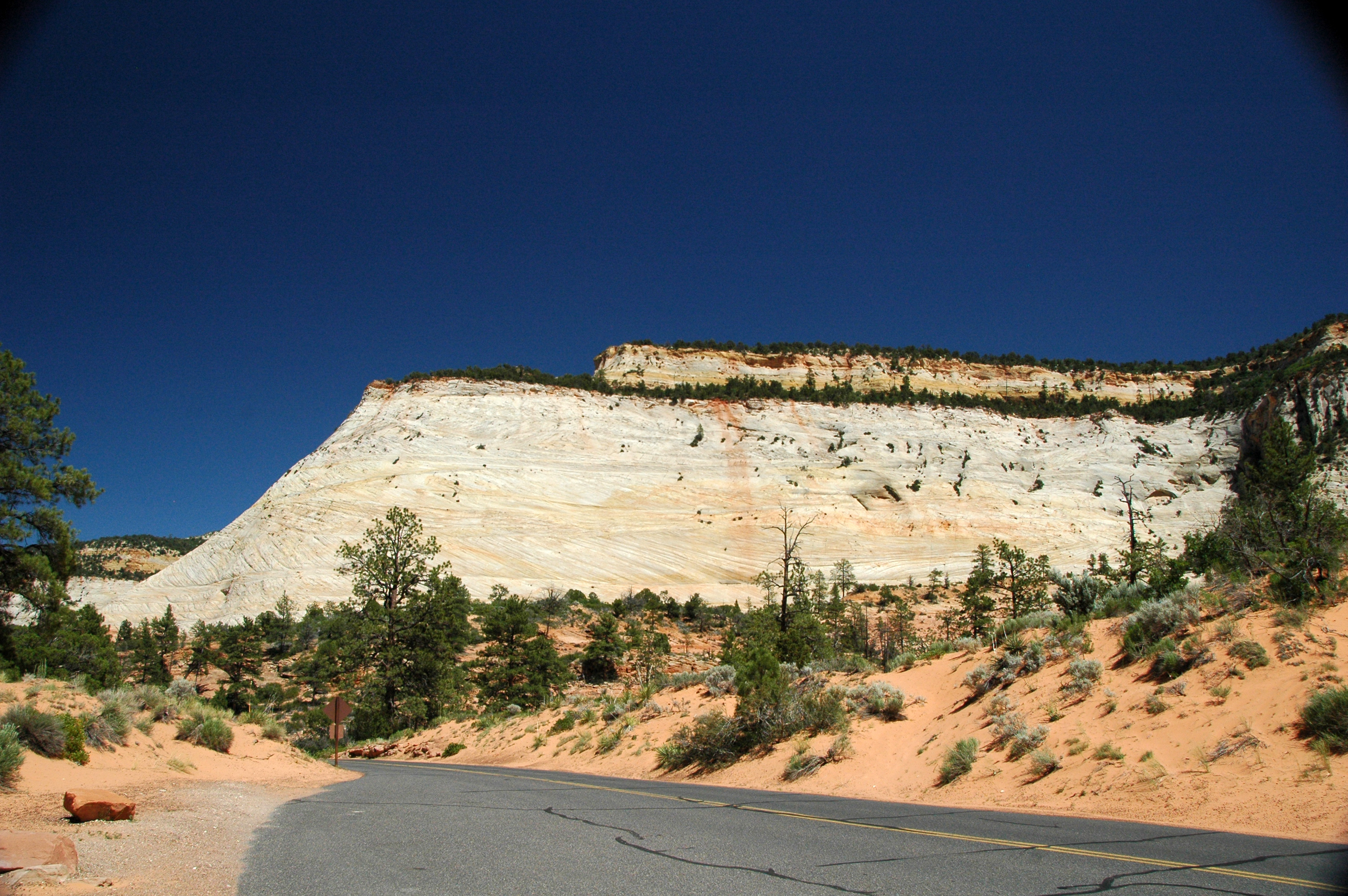
West aspect, viewed from Highway 9

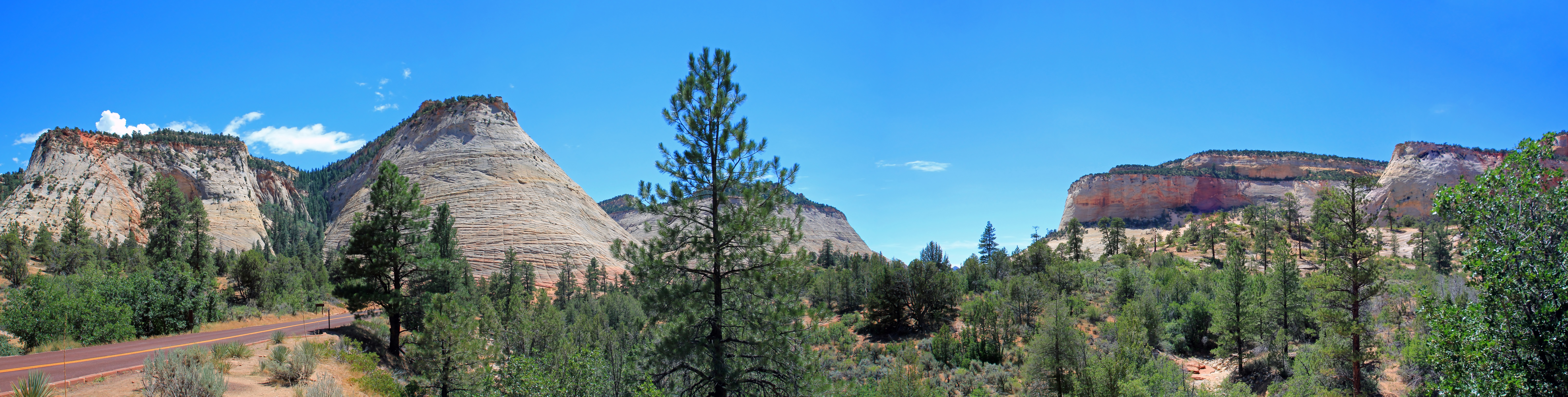
Zion National Park's East Entrance, Checkerboard Mesa to left

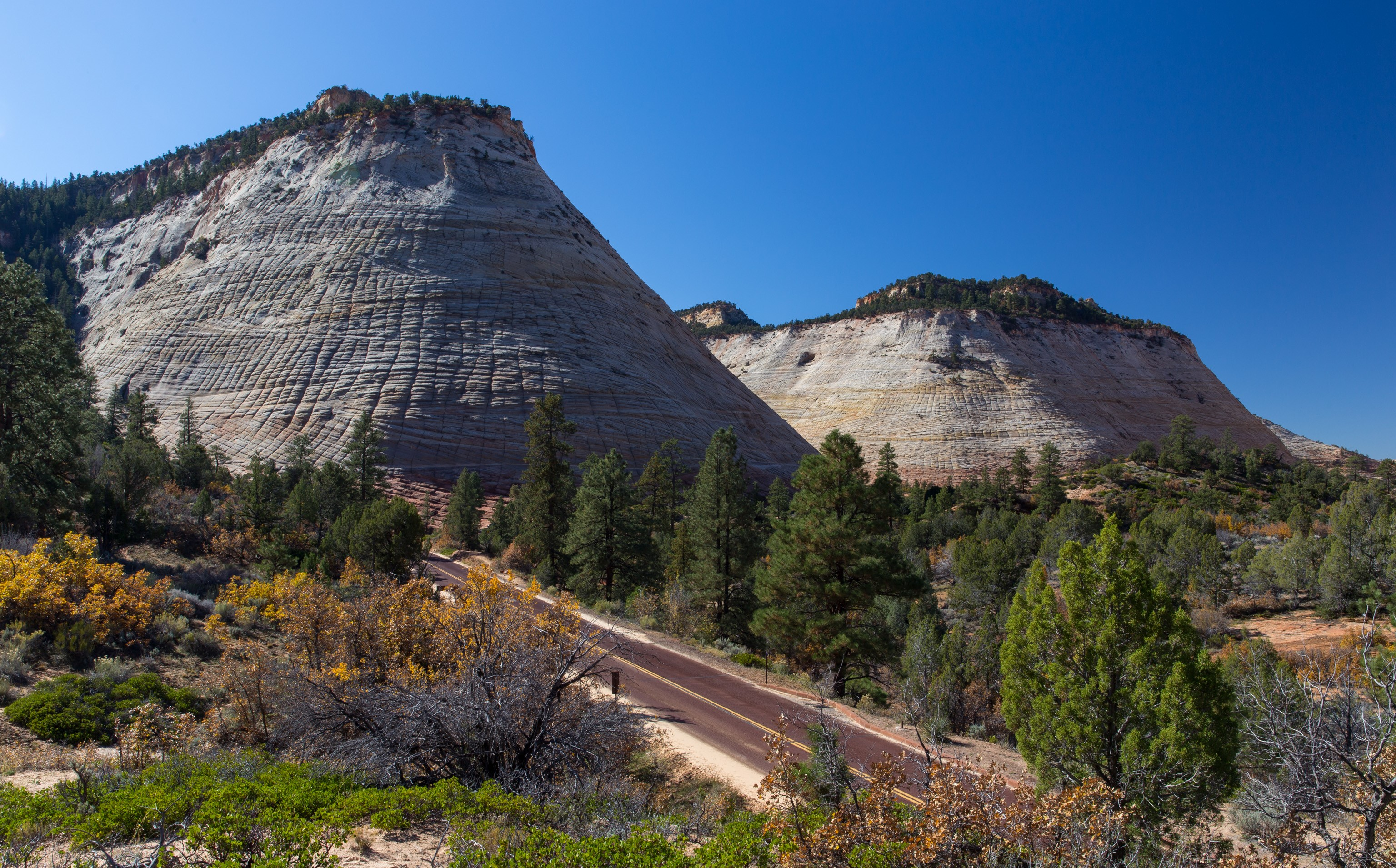
Checkerboard Mesa (left) and Crazy Quilt Mesa (right)

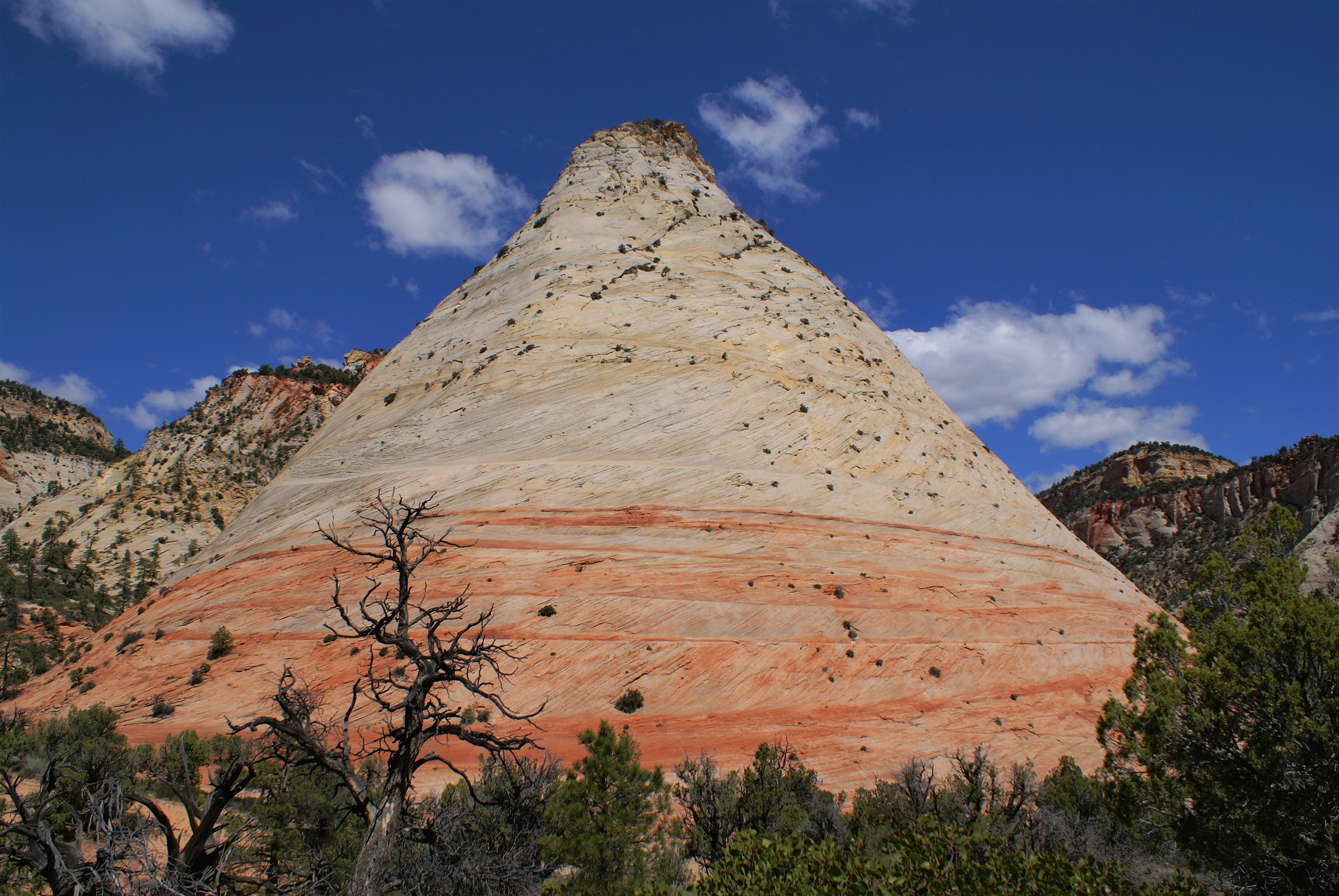
The south end of Checkerboard Mesa (Parunuweap Canyon side)
