= Tabernacle Dome =

Mountain in the state of Utah

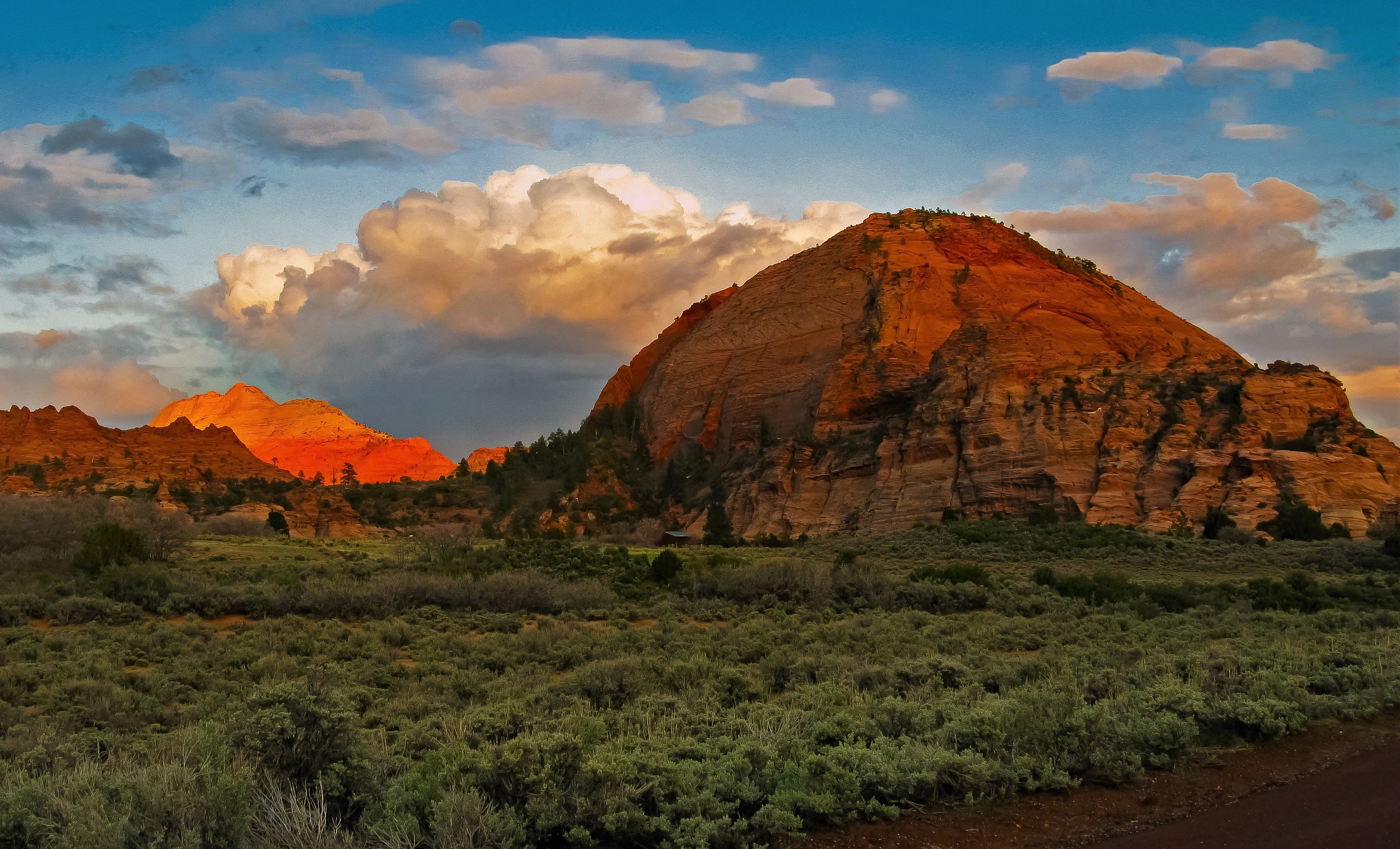
- Northwest aspect

Highest point
- Elevation: 6,430 ft (1,960 m)
- Prominence: 510 ft (160 m)
- Parent peak: South Guardian Angel (7,140 ft)
- Isolation: 1.86 mi (2.99 km)
- Coordinates: 37°18′00″N 113°05′36″W

Geography
- Location within Utah Location within the United States
- Country: United States
- State: Utah
- County: Washington
- Protected area: Zion National Park
- Parent range: Colorado Plateau
- Topo map: USGS The Guardian Angels

Geology
- Rock age: Jurassic
- Rock type: Navajo sandstone

Climbing
- Easiest route: class 5.2 climbing

Tabernacle Dome is a 6,430-foot (1,960 meter) elevation summit located in Zion National Park, in Washington County of southwest Utah, United States. Tabernacle Dome, a formation composed of Navajo Sandstone, is situated at the southeastern end of Cave Valley, 10 mi (16 km) northwest of Springdale, Utah. Its nearest higher neighbor is Cave Knoll, 1.6 mi (3 km) to the north-northwest. Other neighbors include South Guardian Angel, 1.9 mi (3 km) to the east, and North Guardian Angel, 2.2 mi (4 km) to the northeast. Precipitation runoff from this mountain drains into tributaries of the Virgin River. Access to this peak is via the Kolob Terrace Road. This peak's name was officially adopted in 1934 by the U.S. Board on Geographic Names. It is named for its resemblance to the Mormon Tabernacle in Salt Lake City.

== Climate ==
Spring and fall are the most favorable seasons to visit Tabernacle Dome. According to the Köppen climate classification system, it is located in a Cold semi-arid climate zone, which is defined by the coldest month having an average mean temperature below 32 °F (0 °C), and at least 50% of the total annual precipitation being received during the spring and summer. This desert climate receives less than 10 inches (250 millimeters) of annual rainfall, and snowfall is generally light during the winter.

== See also ==
- List of mountains in Utah
- Geology of the Zion and Kolob canyons area
- Colorado Plateau

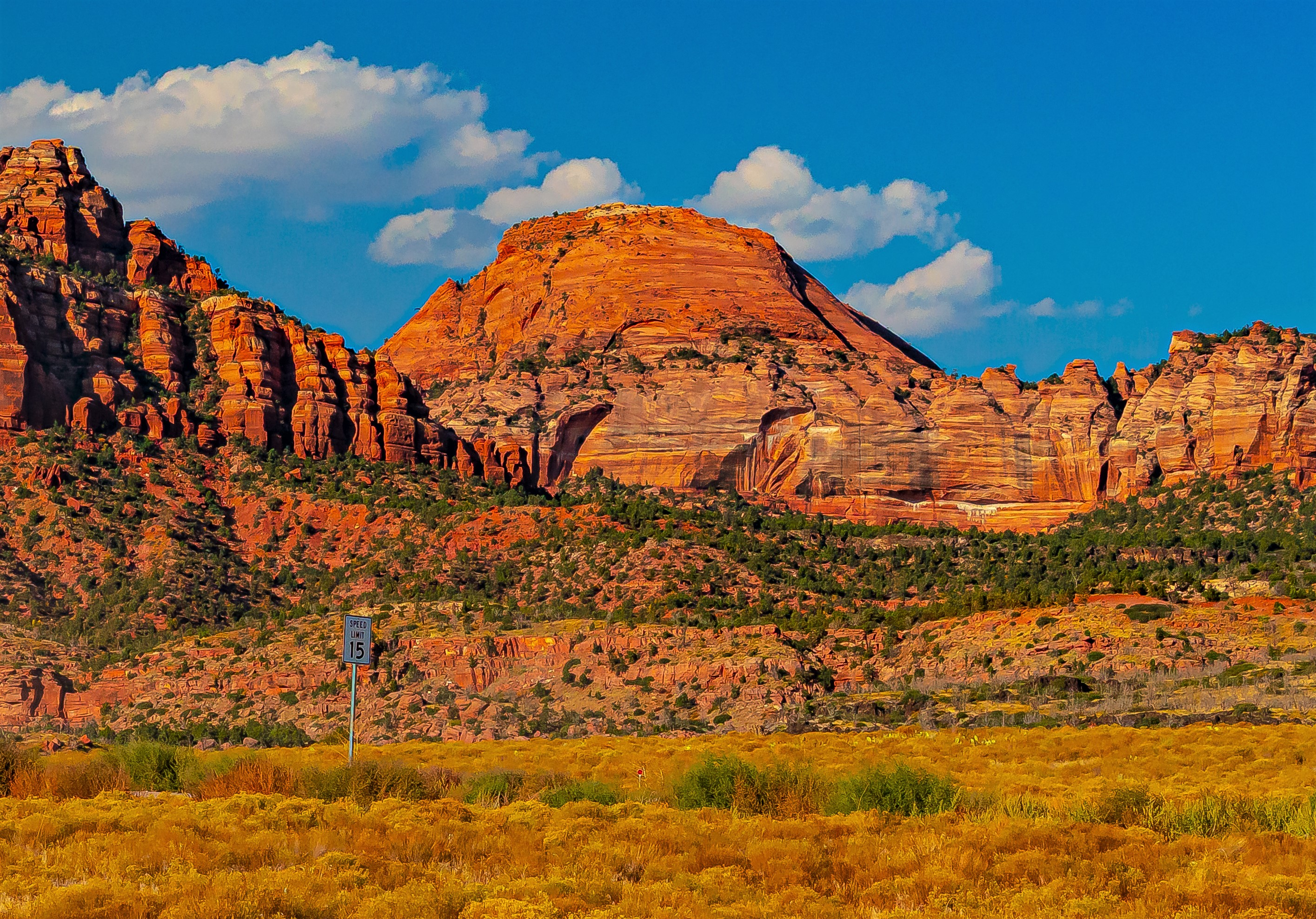
Tabernacle Dome, southwest aspect
