= Cave Knoll =

Mountain in Utah, United States

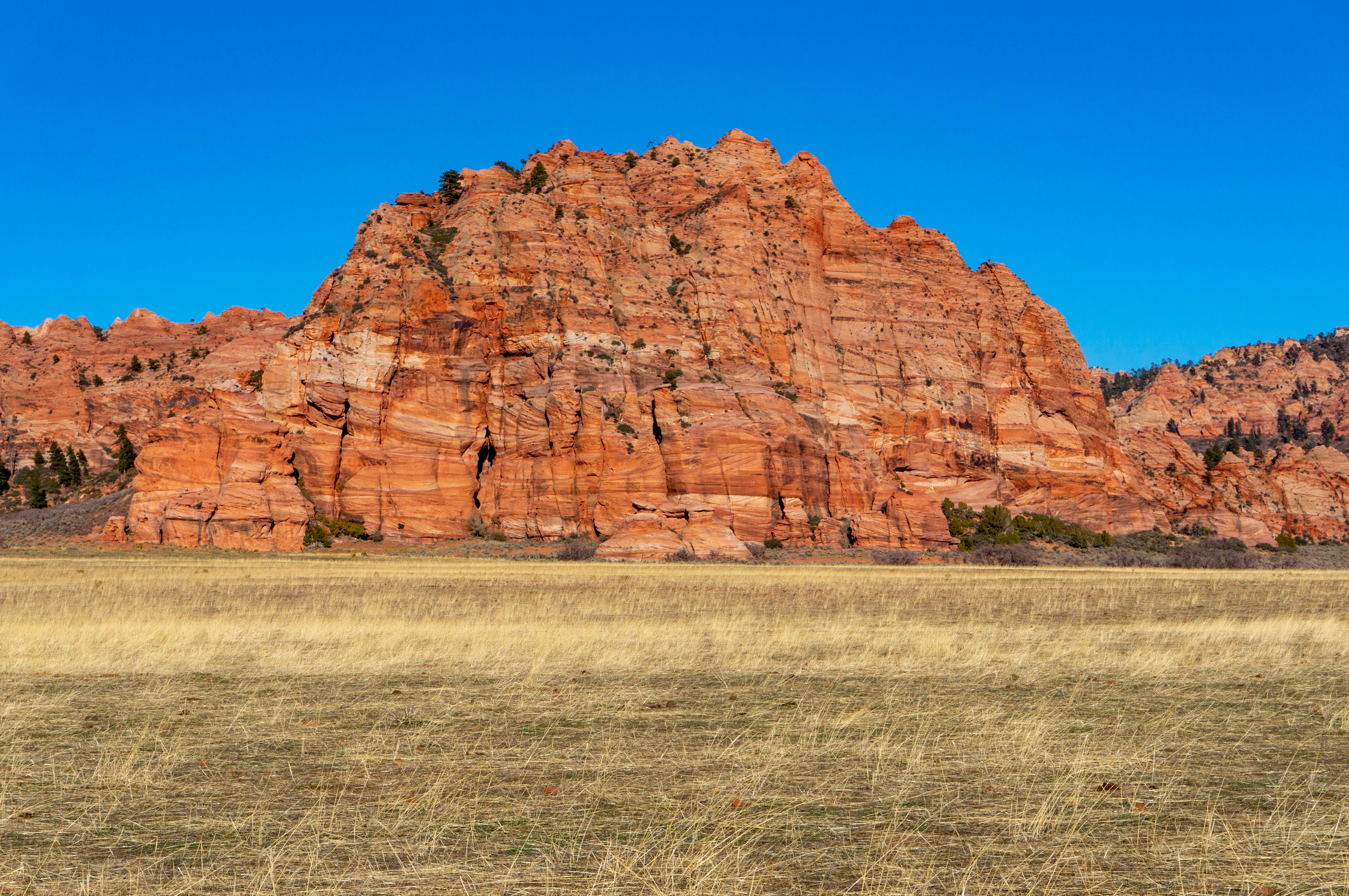
- West aspect

Highest point
- Elevation: 6,486 ft (1,977 m)
- Prominence: 95 ft (29 m)
- Parent peak: Spendlove Knoll (6,895 ft)
- Isolation: 1.12 mi (1.80 km)
- Coordinates: 37°19′19″N 113°06′10″W

Geography
- Location within Utah Location within the United States
- Country: United States
- State: Utah
- County: Washington
- Protected area: Zion National Park
- Parent range: Colorado Plateau
- Topo map: USGS The Guardian Angels

Geology
- Rock age: Jurassic
- Rock type: Navajo sandstone

Climbing
- Easiest route: class 3 scrambling

Cave Knoll is a 6,486-foot (1,977 m) summit located in Zion National Park, in Washington County of southwest Utah, United States. Cave Knoll, a formation composed of Navajo Sandstone, is situated in Cave Valley, 11.5 mi (18.5 km) northwest of Springdale, Utah. Its neighbors include Pine Valley Peak, 1.7 mi (3 km) to the northeast, Tabernacle Dome, 1.6 mi (3 km) to the south-southeast, and North Guardian Angel, 2.5 mi (4 km) to the east. Precipitation runoff from this mountain drains into tributaries of the Virgin River. Access to this peak is via the Kolob Terrace Road. This peak's name was officially adopted in 1934 by the U.S. Board on Geographic Names.

== Climate ==
Spring and fall are the most favorable seasons to visit Cave Knoll. According to the Köppen climate classification system, it is located in a Cold semi-arid climate zone, which is defined by the coldest month having an average mean temperature below 32 °F (0 °C), and at least 50% of the total annual precipitation being received during the spring and summer. This desert climate receives less than 10 inches (250 millimeters) of annual rainfall, and snowfall is generally light during the winter.

== Gallery ==
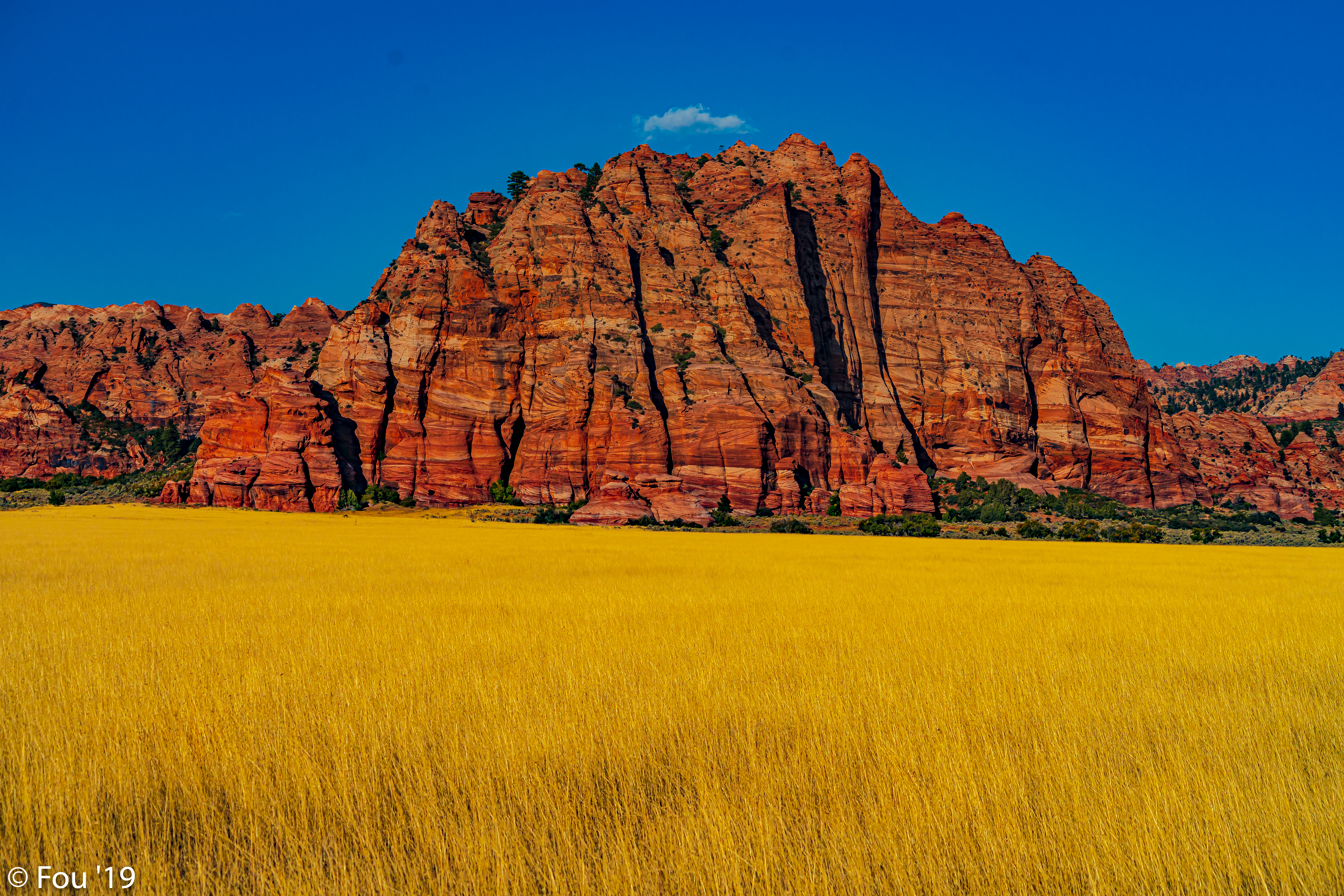
Cave Knoll

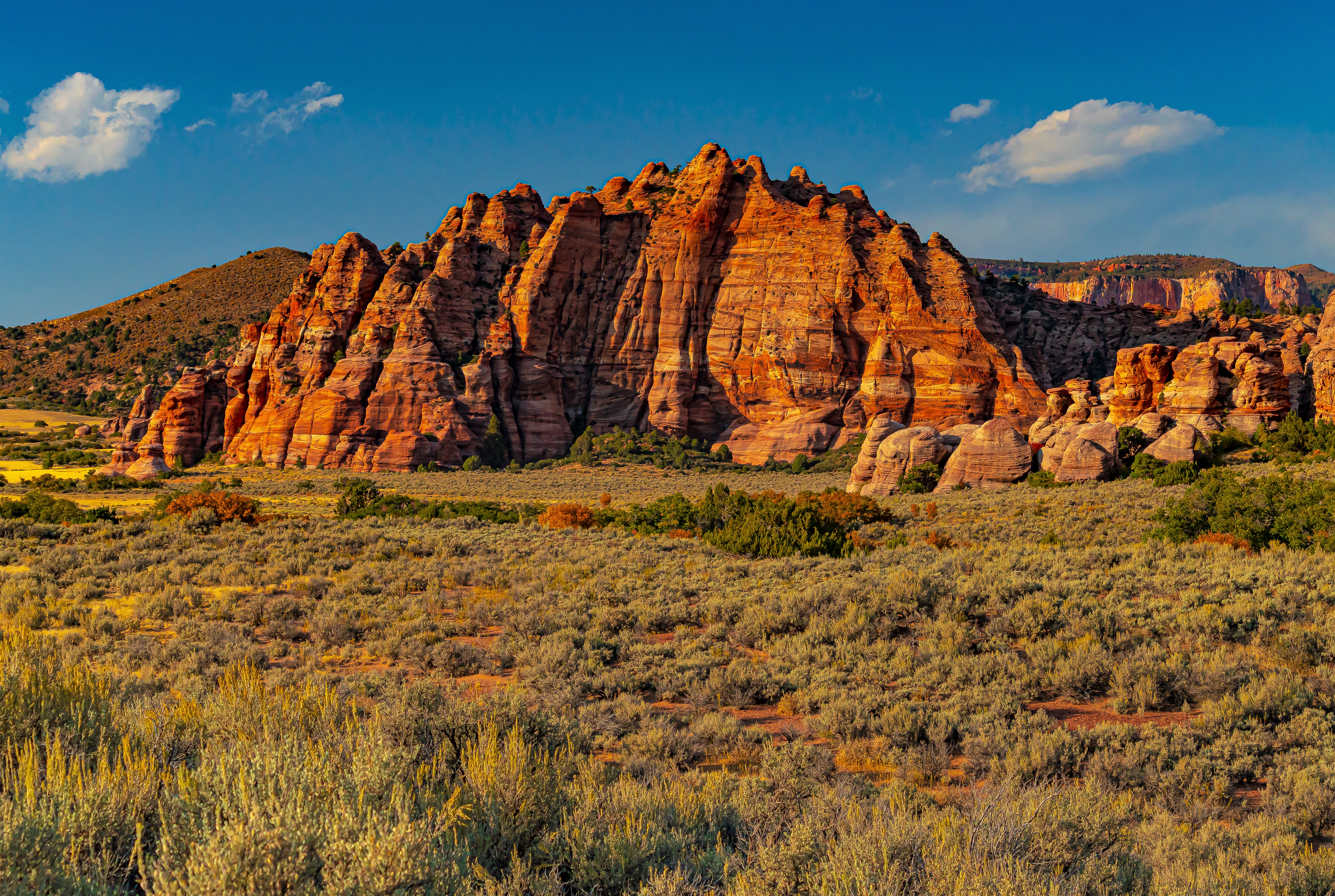

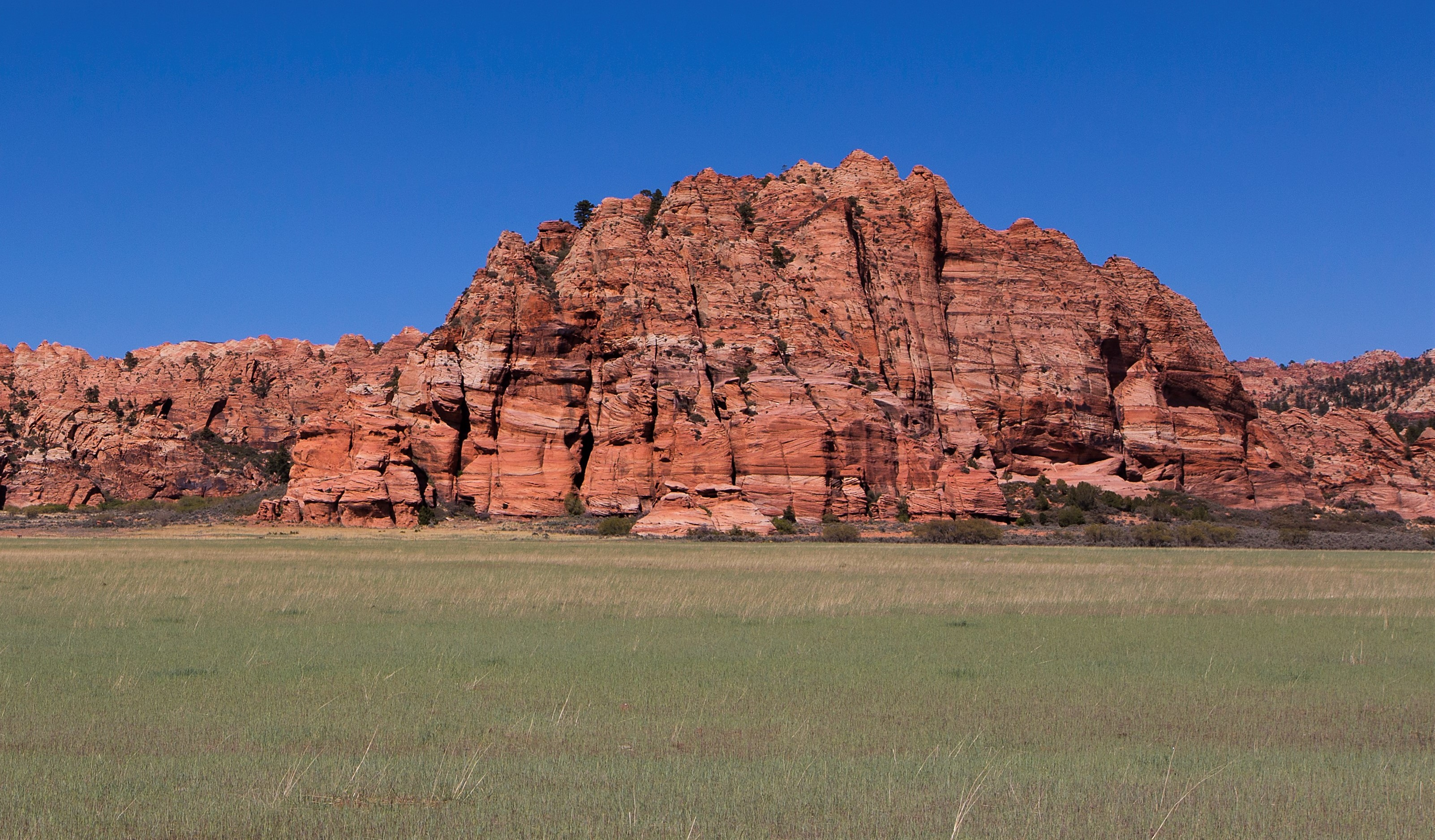

== See also ==
- List of mountains in Utah
- Geology of the Zion and Kolob canyons area
- Colorado Plateau
