= Pine Valley Peak =

Mountain in the state of Utah

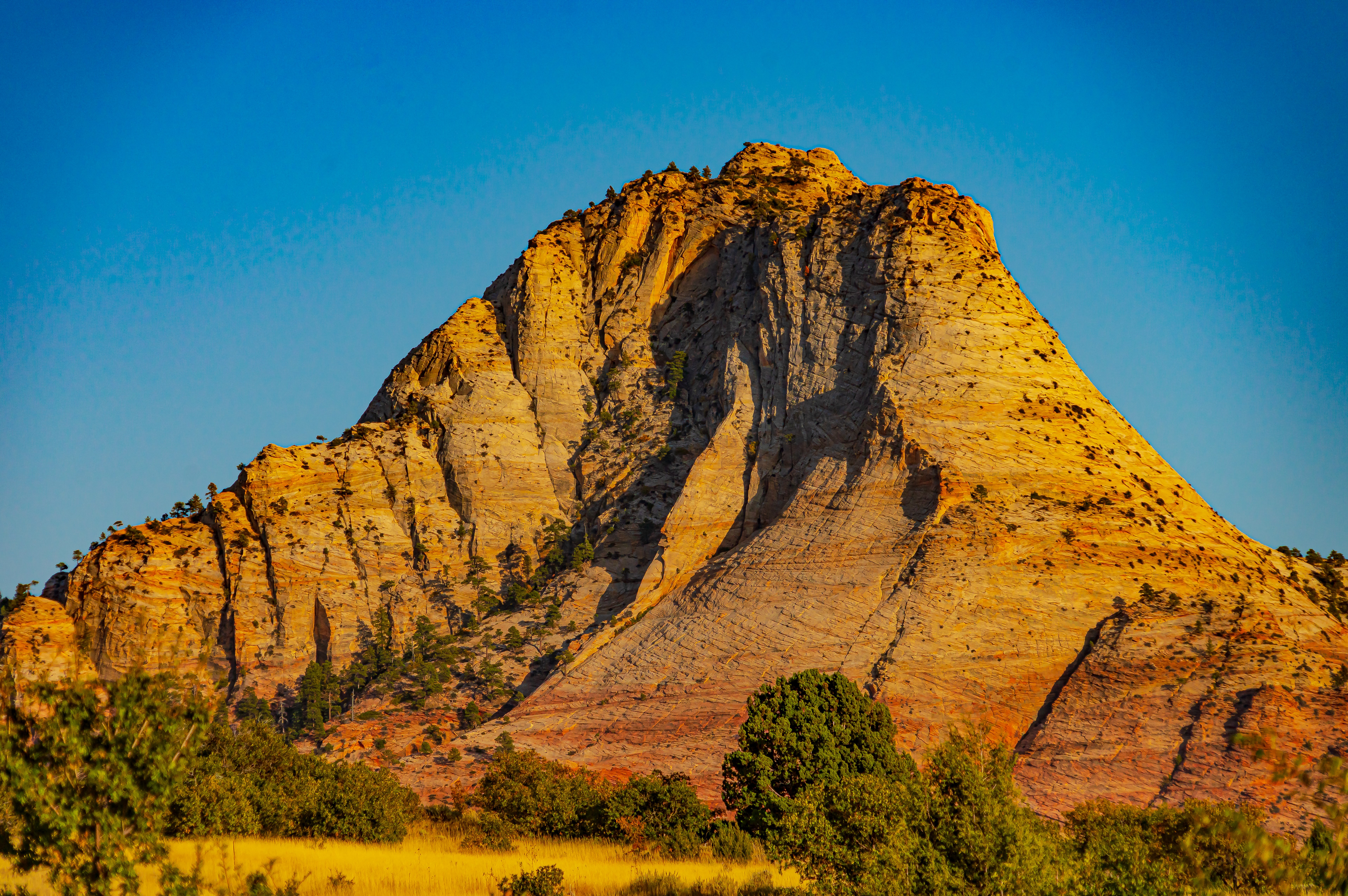
- Northwest aspect

Highest point
- Elevation: 7,415 ft (2,260 m)
- Prominence: 535 ft (163 m)
- Parent peak: Windy Peak (7,888 ft)
- Isolation: 1.58 mi (2.54 km)
- Coordinates: 37°20′09″N 113°04′41″W

Geography
- Location within Utah Location within the United States
- Country: United States
- State: Utah
- County: Washington
- Protected area: Zion National Park
- Parent range: Colorado Plateau
- Topo map: USGS The Guardian Angels

Geology
- Rock age: Jurassic
- Rock type: Navajo sandstone

Climbing
- Easiest route: class 4 scrambling

Pine Valley Peak is a 7,415-foot (2,260 m) mountain located in Zion National Park in Washington County, Utah, United States.

== Description ==
Pine Valley Peak, a formation composed of white Navajo Sandstone, is situated in Pine Valley, 11.5 mi (18.5 km) north-northwest of Springdale, Utah. Its neighbors include North Guardian Angel, 1.7 mi (3 km) to the southeast, and South Guardian Angel, 3 mi (5 km) to the south-southeast. Precipitation runoff from this mountain drains into tributaries of the Virgin River. Access to this peak is via the Kolob Terrace Road. This peak's name was officially adopted in 1934 by the U.S. Board on Geographic Names.

== Climate ==
Spring and fall are the most favorable seasons to visit Pine Valley Peak. According to the Köppen climate classification system, it is located in a Cold semi-arid climate zone, which is defined by the coldest month having an average mean temperature below 32 °F (0 °C), and at least 50% of the total annual precipitation being received during the spring and summer. This desert climate receives less than 10 inches (250 millimeters) of annual rainfall, and snowfall is generally light during the winter.

== Gallery ==
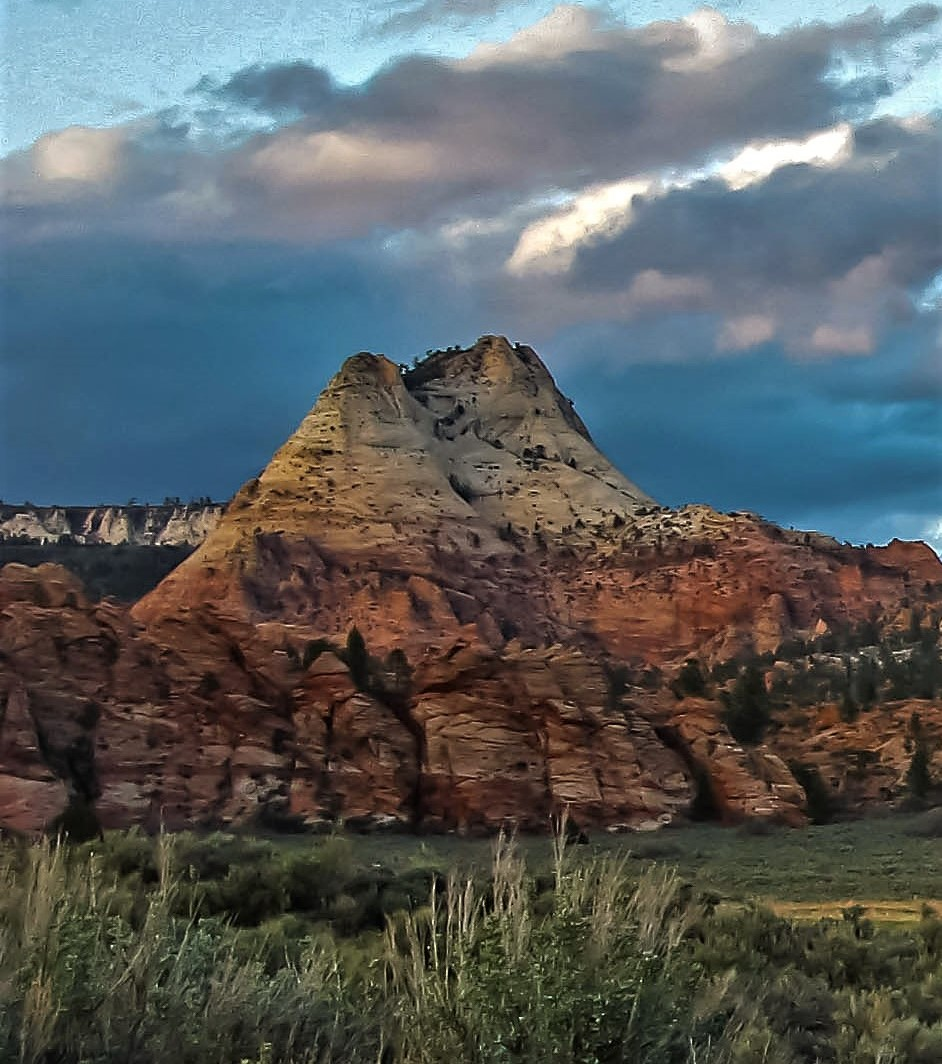
Pine Valley Peak

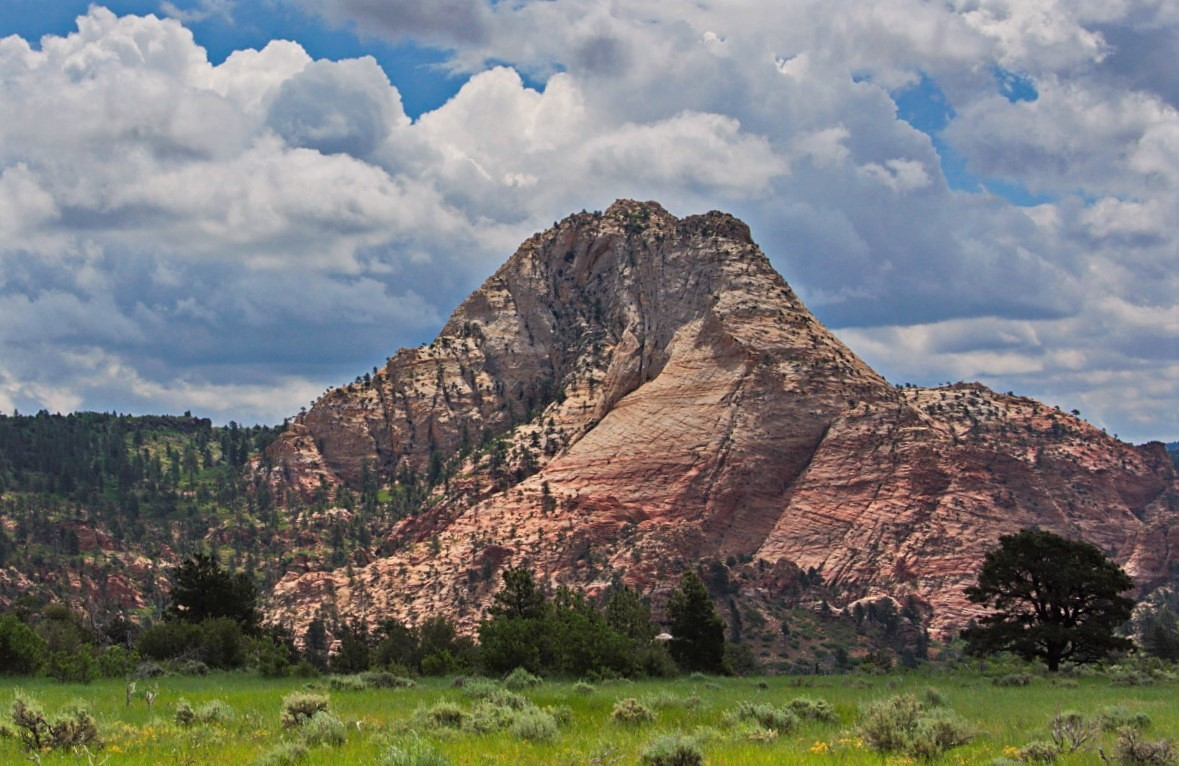

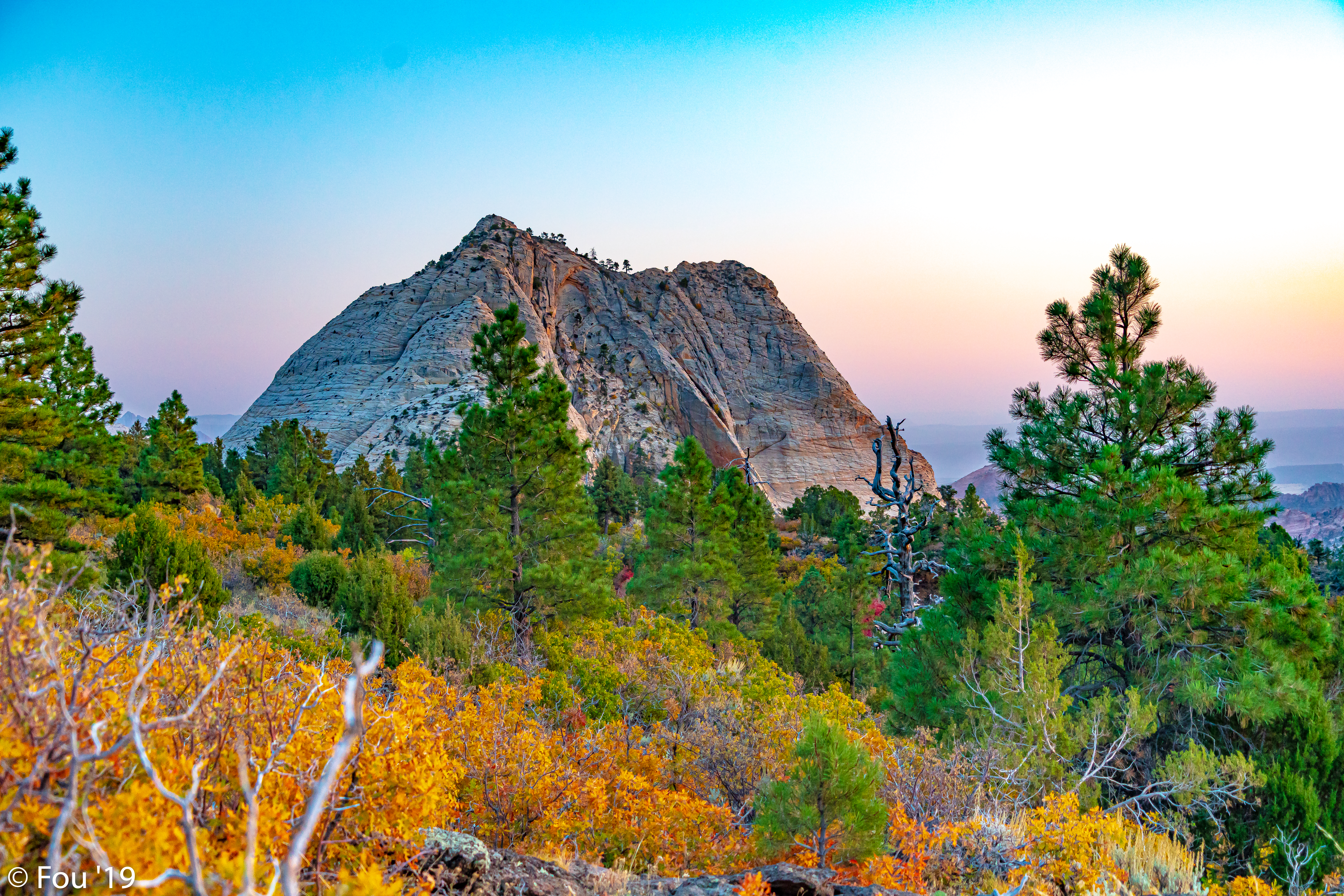

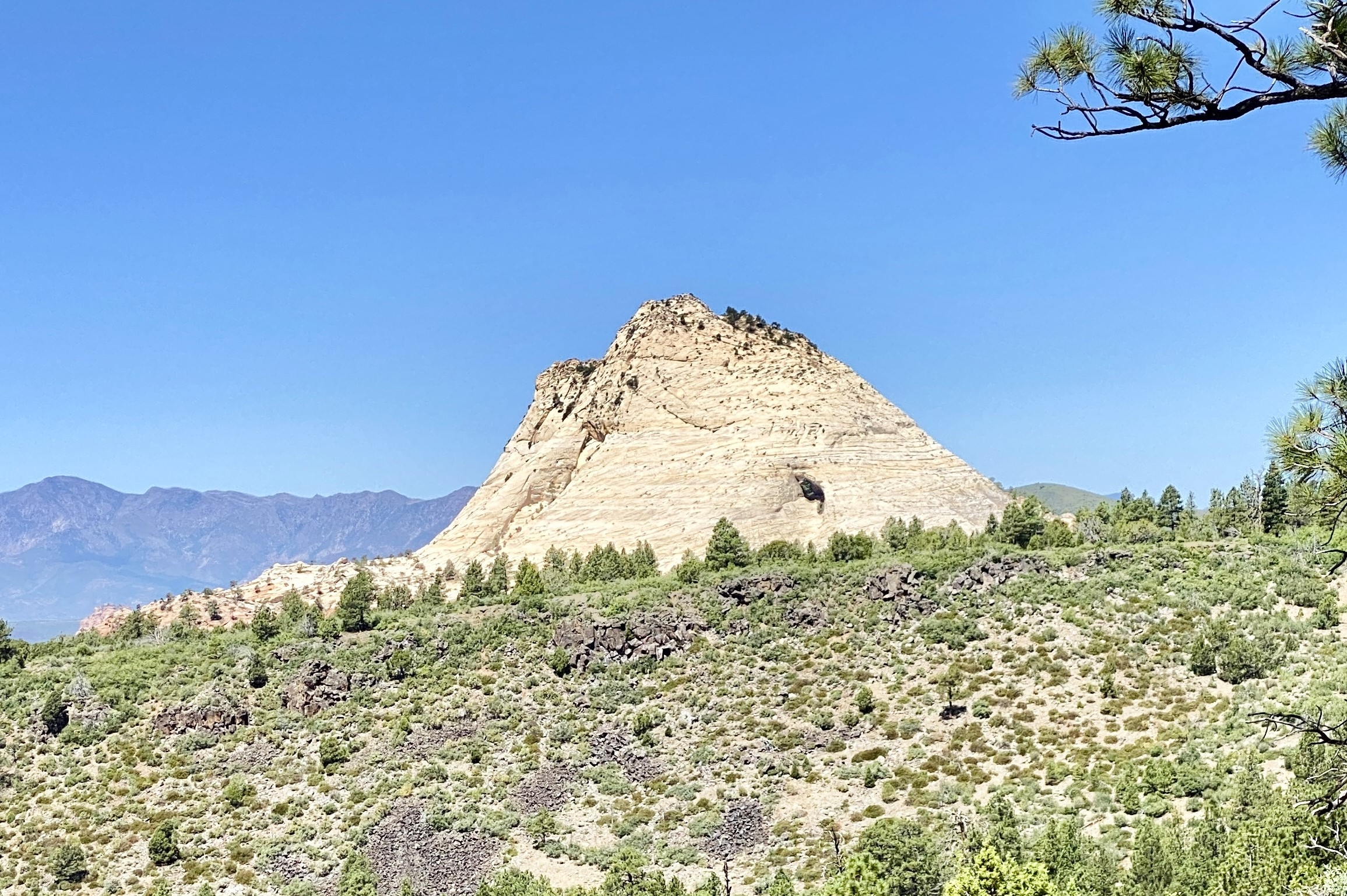
Southeast aspect

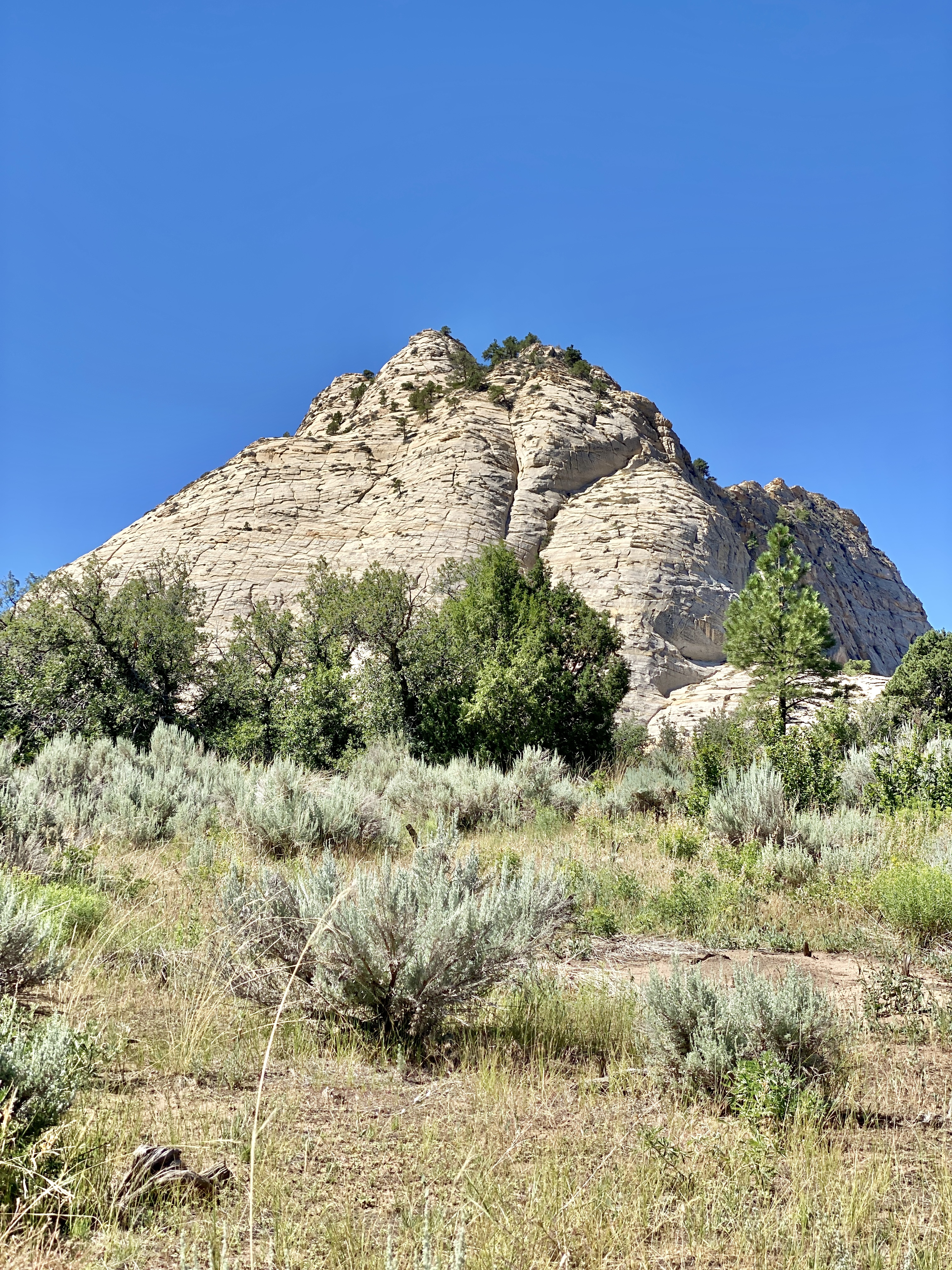
Northeast aspect of Pine Valley Peak viewed from Wildcat Canyon Trail

== See also ==
- List of mountains of Utah
- Geology of the Zion and Kolob canyons area
- Colorado Plateau
