= Northgate Peaks =

Mountains in Utah, United States

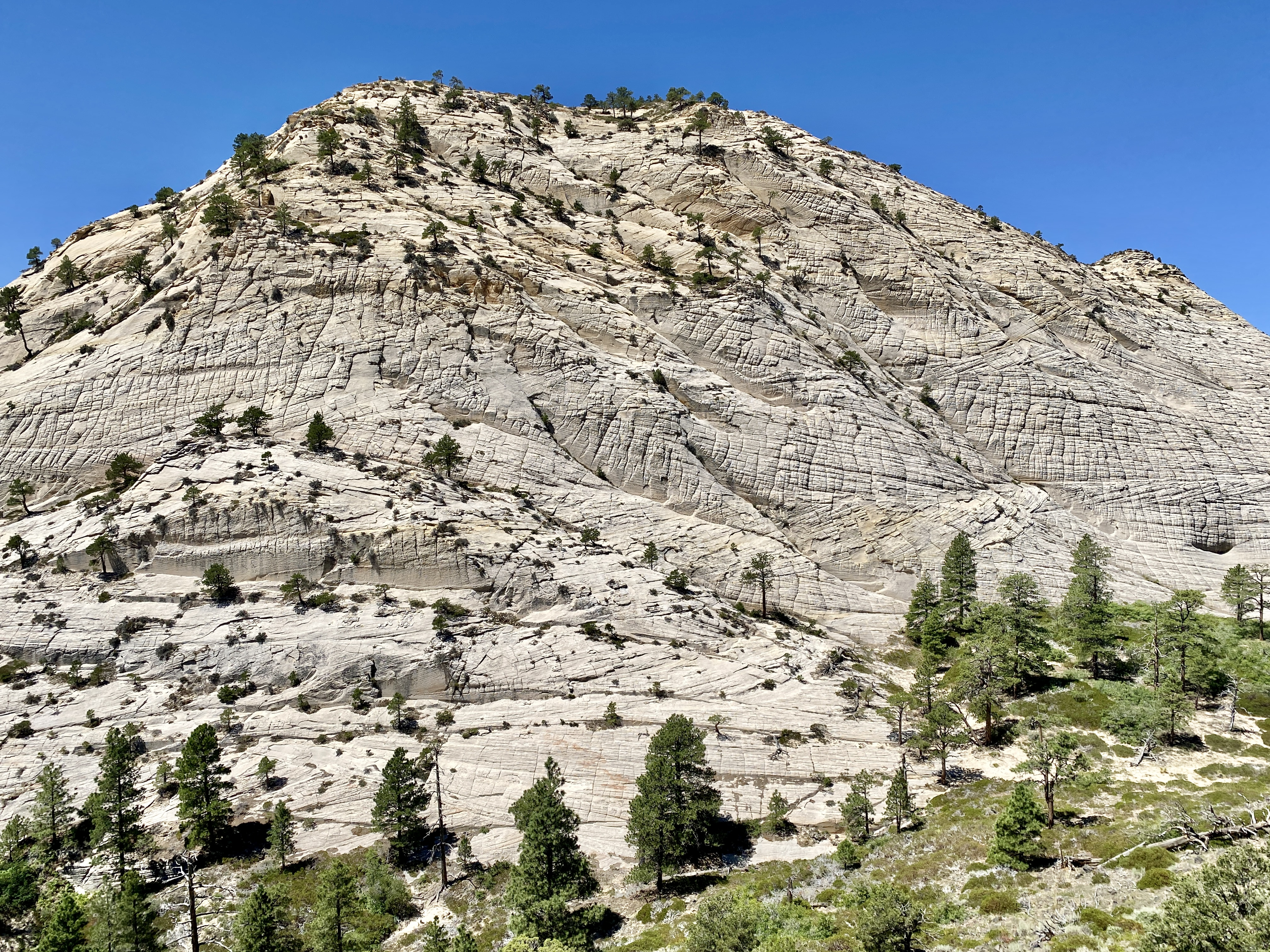
- East aspect of West Northgate Peak

Highest point
- Elevation: 7,267 ft (2,215 m)
- Prominence: 507 ft (155 m)
- Parent peak: North Guardian Angel (7,395 ft)
- Isolation: 0.55 mi (0.89 km)
- Coordinates: 37°19′27″N 113°03′33″W

Geography
- Location within Utah Location within the United States
- Country: United States
- State: Utah
- County: Washington
- Protected area: Zion National Park
- Parent range: Colorado Plateau
- Topo map: USGS The Guardian Angels

Geology
- Rock age: Jurassic
- Rock type: Navajo sandstone

Climbing
- Easiest route: class 2+

Northgate Peaks are two summits in Washington County, Utah, United States.

== Description ==
Northgate Peaks are located 10 miles (16 km) north-northwest of Springdale, Utah, in Zion National Park. The west peak at 7,267 ft-elevation (2,215 m) is the higher of the two peaks and the east peak is 7,159 ft (2,182 m). The peaks are composed of white Navajo Sandstone which exhibits some of the same cross-bedding seen on Checkerboard Mesa. The approach to the peaks is via the Wildcat Canyon Trail which connects to the Northgate Peaks Trail, 4.4 miles round-trip from the Kolob Terrace Road. The nearest higher neighbor is North Guardian Angel, 0.57 miles (0.92 km) to the south. The landform's toponym was officially adopted in 1935 by the U.S. Board on Geographic Names and was so named because of their position at the head of a difficult passageway. Precipitation runoff from this mountain drains into North Creek which is a tributary of the Virgin River.

== Climate ==
According to the Köppen climate classification system, the peaks are located in a Cold semi-arid climate zone, which is defined by the coldest month having an average mean temperature below 32 °F (0 °C), and at least 50% of the total annual precipitation being received during the spring and summer. This desert climate receives less than 10 inches (250 millimeters) of annual rainfall, and snowfall is generally light during the winter. Spring and fall are the most favorable seasons to visit Northgate Peaks. Hikers can expect afternoon rain and lightning from the seasonal monsoon in July and August.

== Gallery ==
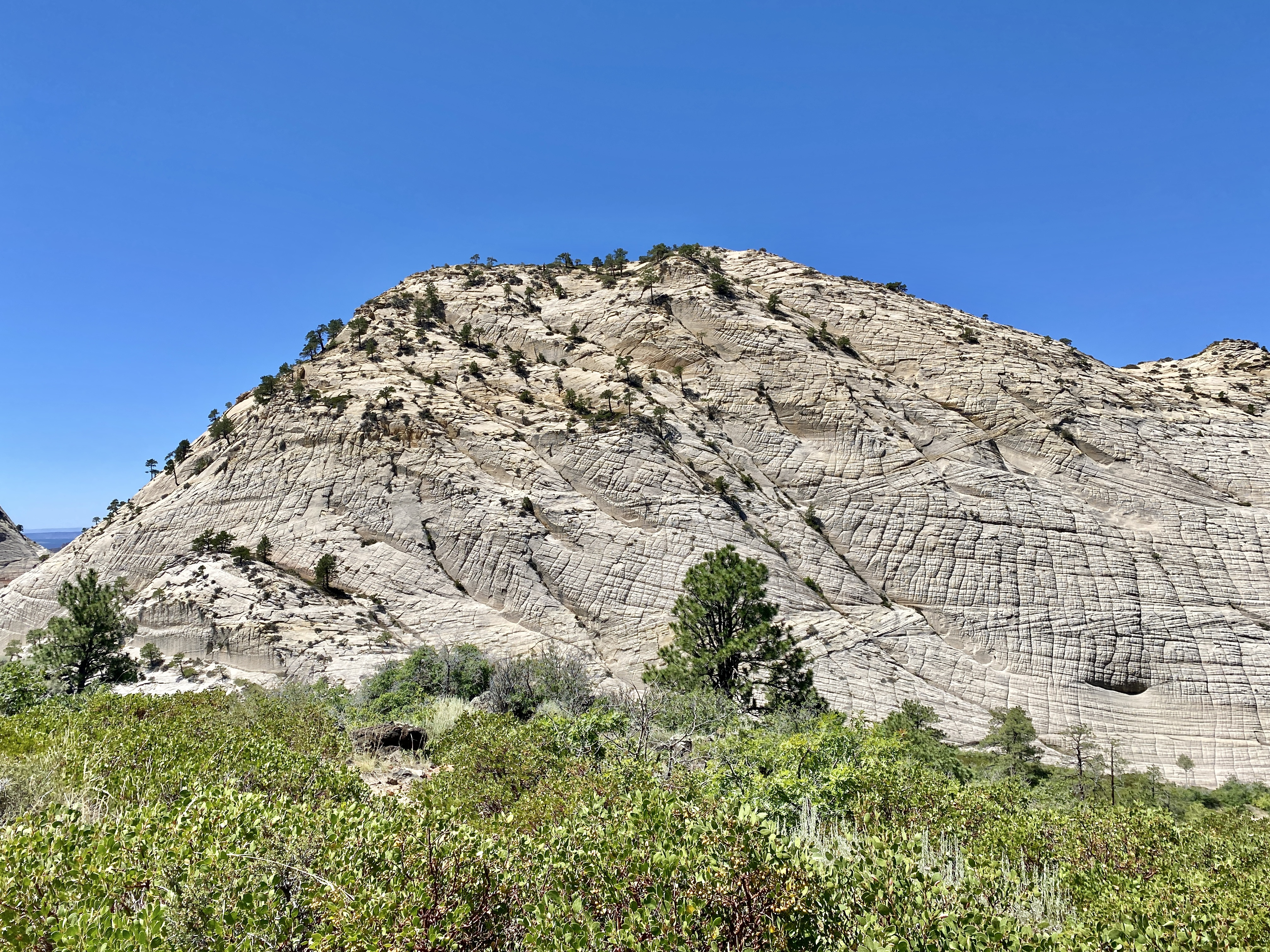
Northgate Peaks' West Peak

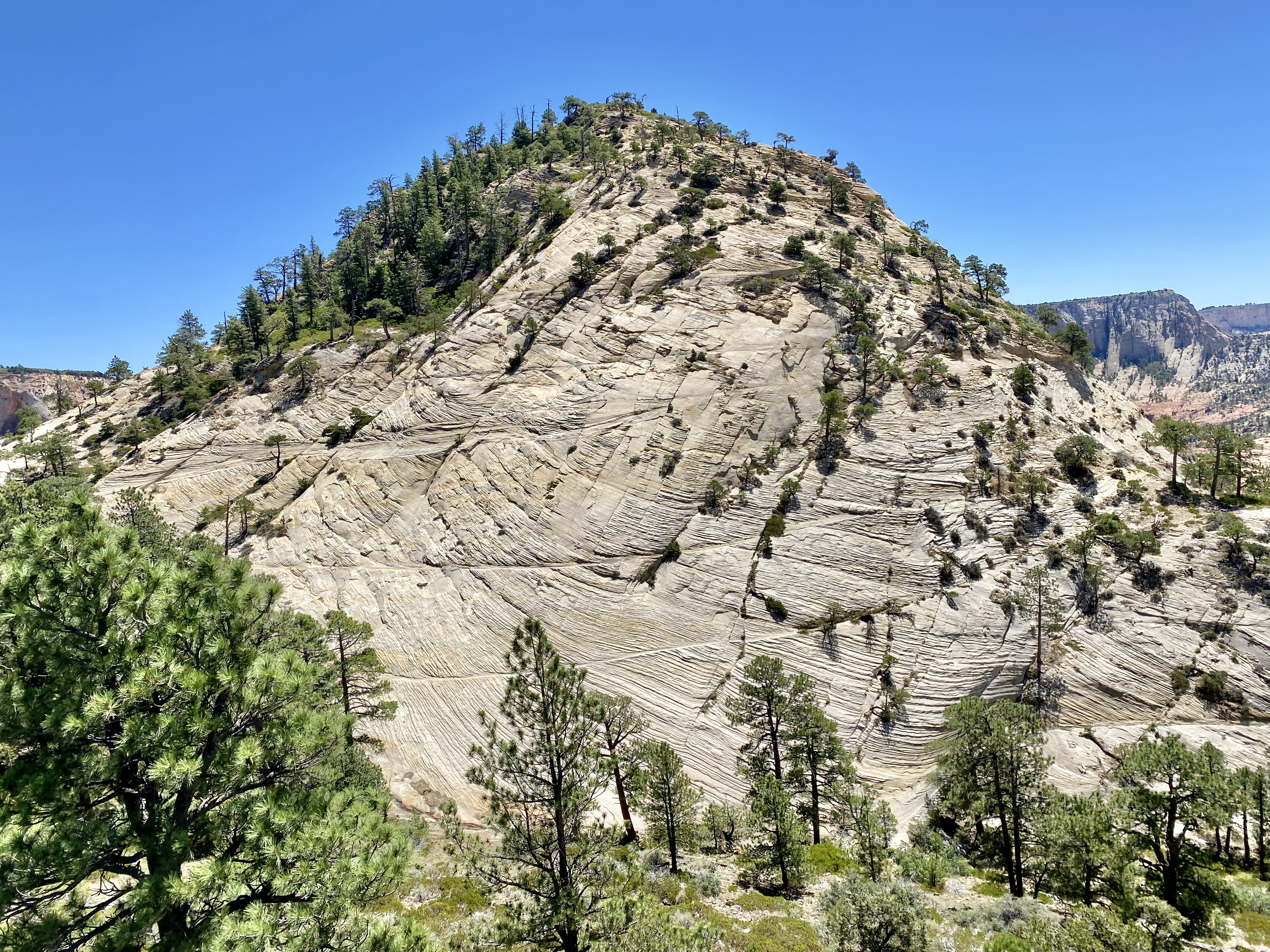
West aspect of the Northgate Peaks' East Peak

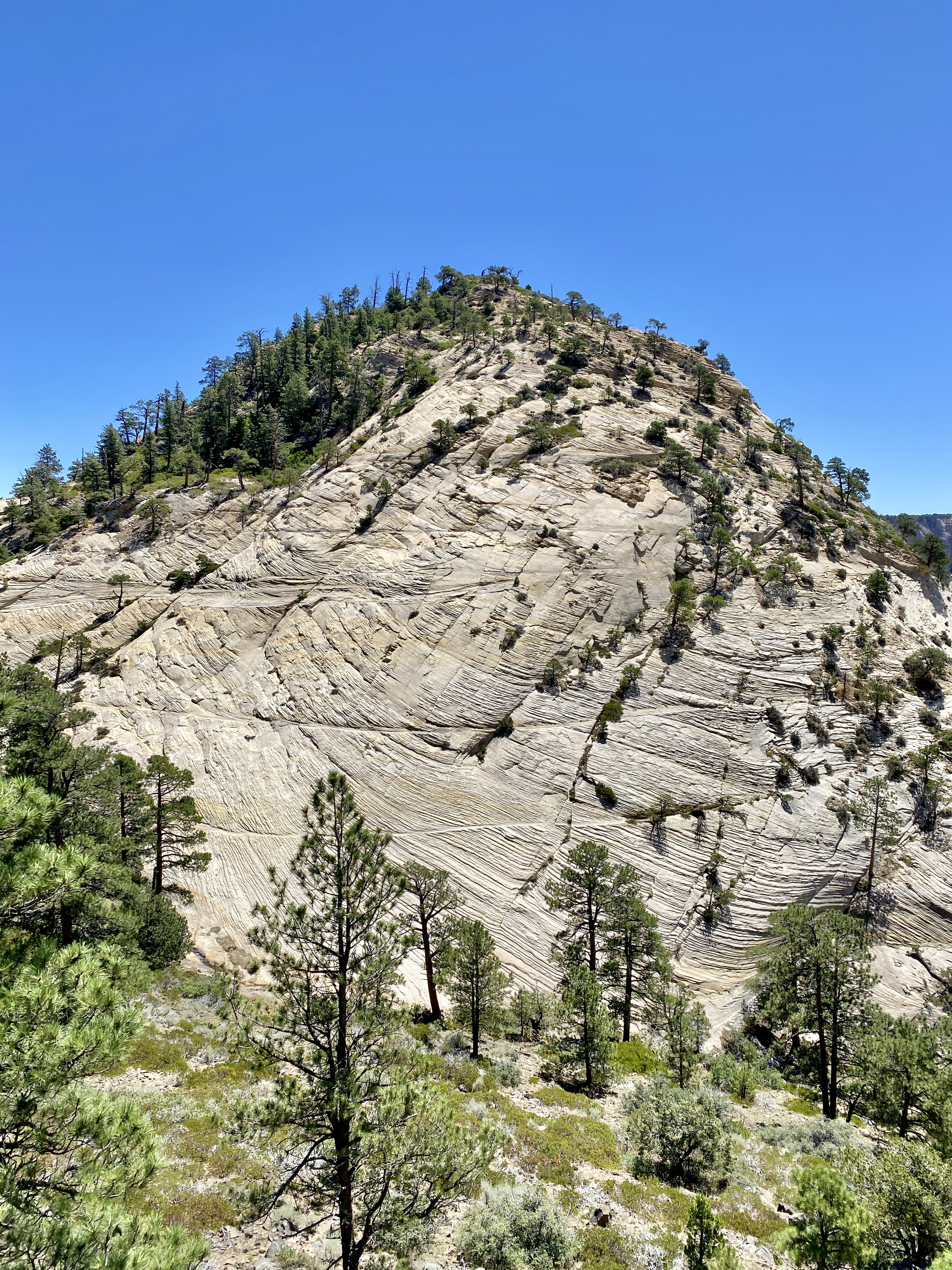
West aspect of the Northgate Peaks' East Peak

== See also ==
- Geology of the Zion and Kolob canyons area
