= The Subway (Zion National Park) =

Landform in Zion National Park, Utah, United States

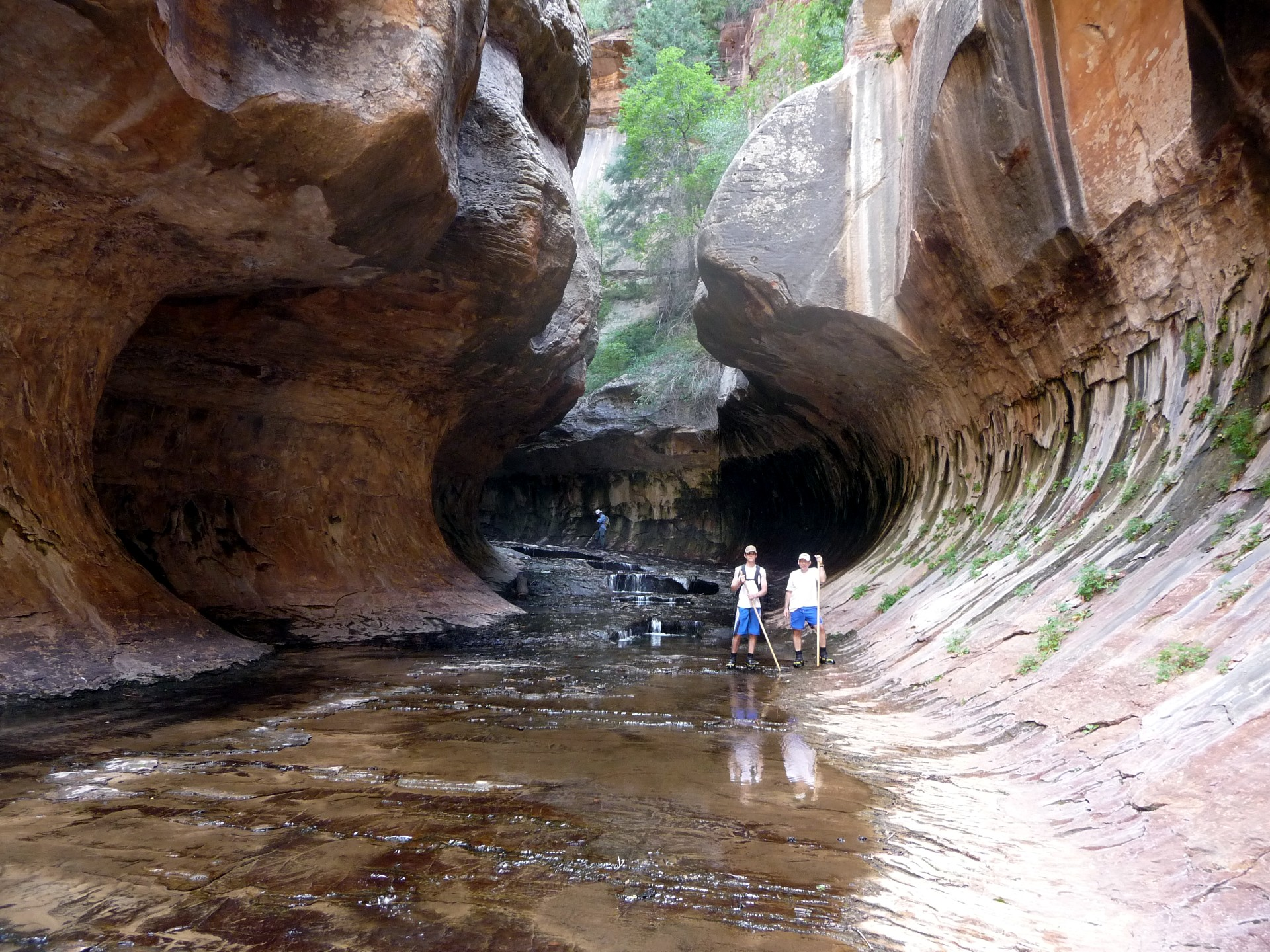
- Entrance to The Subway from the bottom, September 2008
- Map of North Creek (red), Left Fork North Creek (blue) and Right Fork North Creek (purple)
- Location: Zion National Park, Utah, United States
- Nearest city: Springdale
- Coordinates: 37.3091°N 113.0522°W

The Subway is a small, uniquely-shaped slot canyon within the Zion Wilderness in Zion National Park in northeastern Washington County, Utah, United States. The National Park Service limits access to the canyon via a permit system.

== Description ==
The canyon is a fairly short (less than 0.25 miles [0.40 km]) section of the larger Great West Canyon. That canyon is located between two peaks (the North Guardian Angel and the South Guardian Angel) on the Kolob Plateau. The Left Fork North Creek flows through The Subway (and the Great West Canyon).

The Subway is so named for its tube-like, undercut slot canyons.

== Access ==
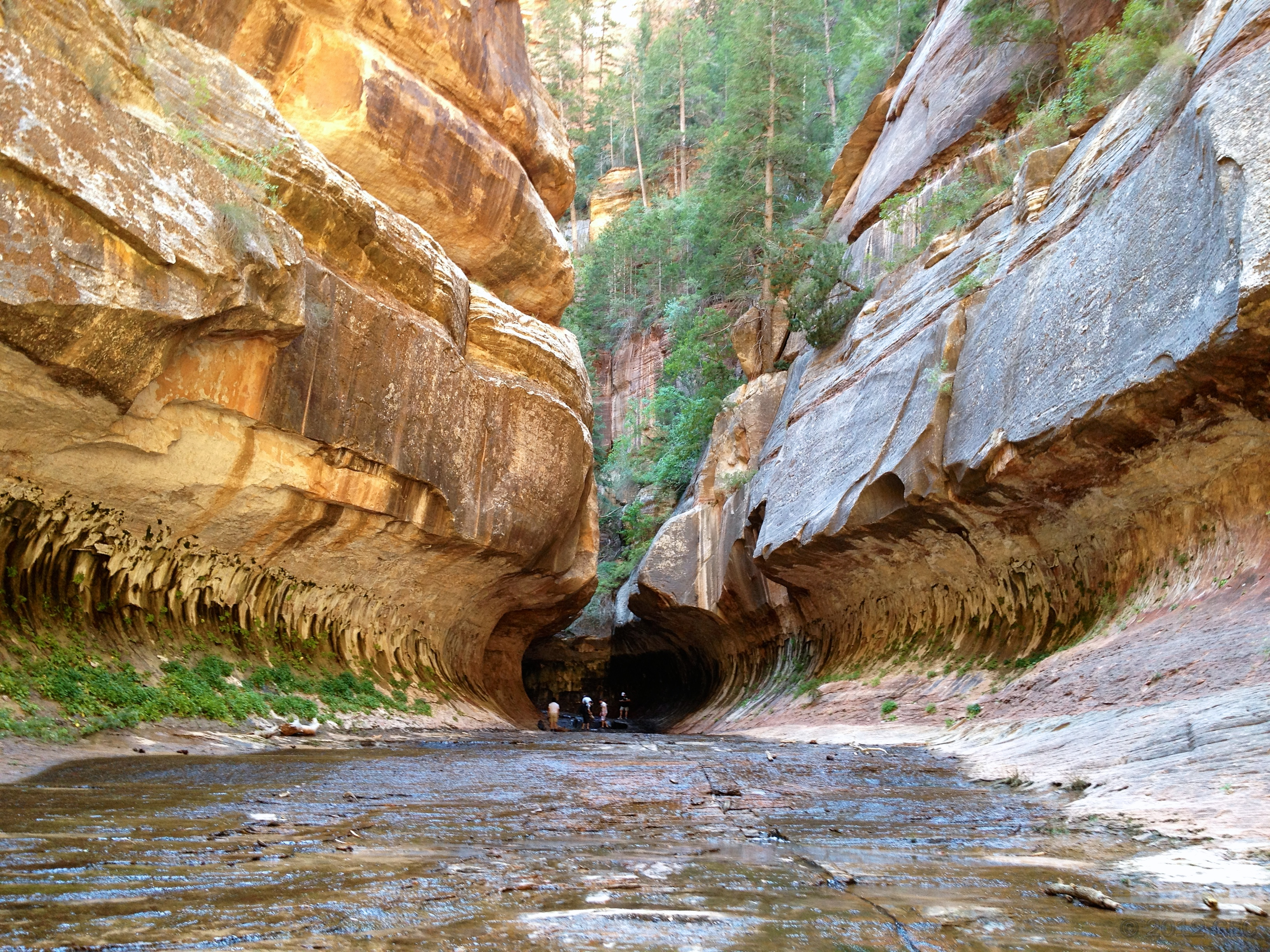
The Subway from the bottom, September 2012

While short in length, long approach and exit hikes are necessary to access The Subway. Canyoneering groups acknowledge two popular routes for visiting The Subway. The through route, for advanced hikers, involves a one-way hike downstream from the Wildcat Canyon Trailhead (37°17′05″N 113°05′46″W). The easier route accesses the lower section of the Subway from downstream, beginning at the Left Fork Trailhead (37°20′23″N 113°04′32″W). Both trailheads are located just off Kolob Terrace Road (also known as the Kolob Reservoir Road), a road which runs north from Utah State Route 9 in Virgin through the national park and eventually, after passing by the Kolob Reservoir, connects with other roads that run farther north to Cedar City and Utah State Route 14.

A Wilderness permit is required to visit The Subway. Permits may be obtained at the Zion Canyon Visitor Center, but may be difficult to obtain during peak visitation months.

== See also ==
- List of canyons and gorges in Utah
