= South Guardian Angel =

Mountain in Utah, United States

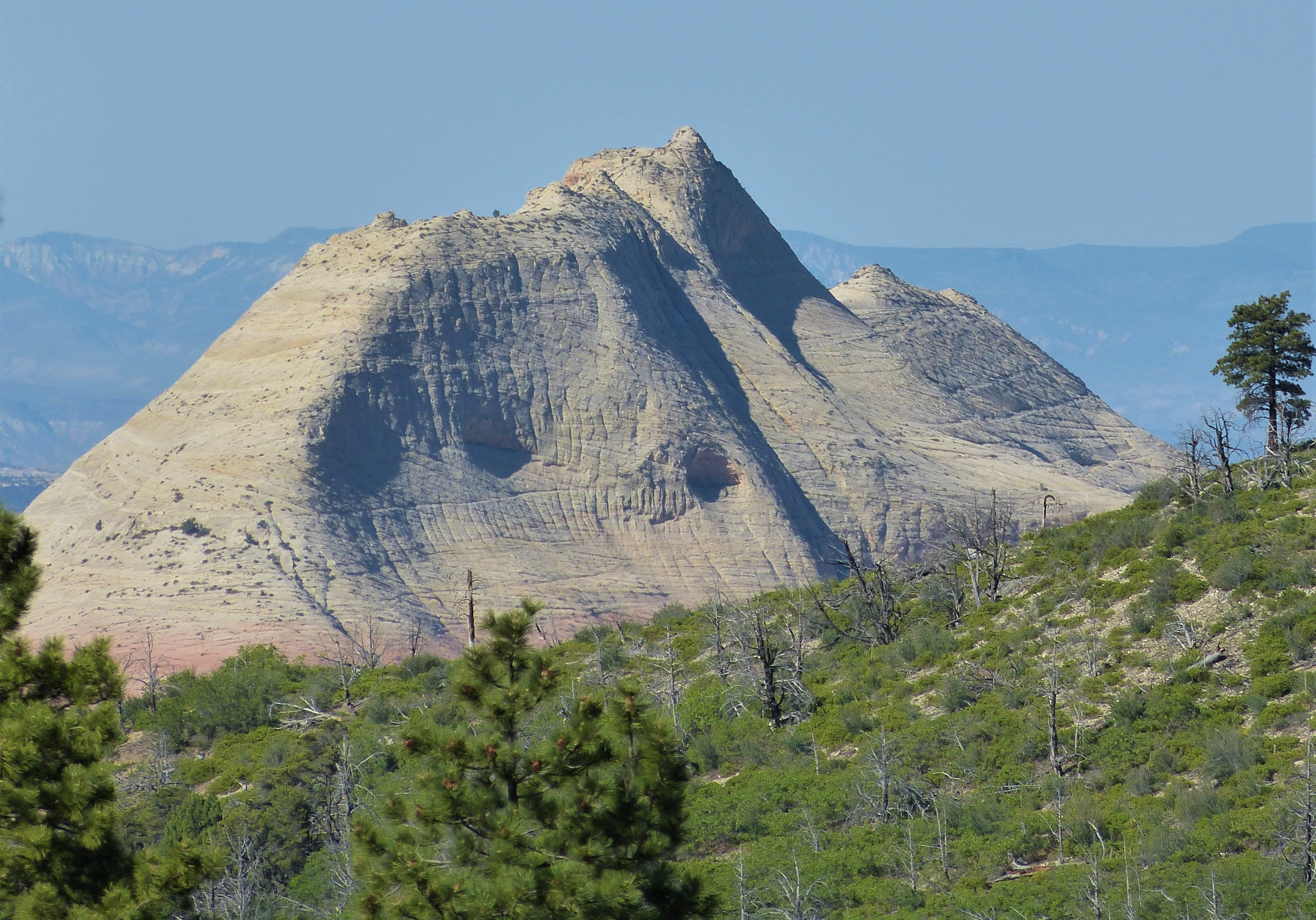
- Northeast aspect, from West Rim Trail

Highest point
- Elevation: 7,140 ft (2,180 m)
- Prominence: 1,205 ft (367 m)
- Parent peak: North Guardian Angel (7,395 ft)
- Isolation: 1.43 mi (2.30 km)
- Coordinates: 37°17′44″N 113°03′35″W

Geography
- Location within Utah Location within the United States
- Country: United States
- State: Utah
- County: Washington
- Protected area: Zion National Park
- Parent range: Colorado Plateau
- Topo map: USGS The Guardian Angels

Geology
- Rock age: Jurassic
- Rock type: Navajo sandstone

Climbing
- Easiest route: class 3+ scrambling

South Guardian Angel is a 7,140-foot (2,180 m) summit located in Zion National Park, in Washington County of southwest Utah, United States.

== Description ==
South Guardian Angel, a formation composed of white Navajo Sandstone, is situated 8.0 mi (12.9 km) north-northwest of Springdale, Utah. Its nearest higher neighbor is North Guardian Angel, 1.44 mi (2 km) to the north. The Subway, a small, uniquely-shaped slot canyon, is set between these two peaks. The South Guardian Angel name was officially adopted in 1934 by the U.S. Board on Geographic Names. Precipitation runoff from this mountain drains into North Creek, a tributary of the Virgin River.

== Climate ==
Spring and fall are the most favorable seasons to visit South Guardian Angel. According to the Köppen climate classification system, it is located in a Cold semi-arid climate zone, which is defined by the coldest month having an average mean temperature below 32 °F (0 °C), and at least 50% of the total annual precipitation being received during the spring and summer. This desert climate receives less than 10 inches (250 millimeters) of annual rainfall, and snowfall is generally light during the winter.

== Gallery ==
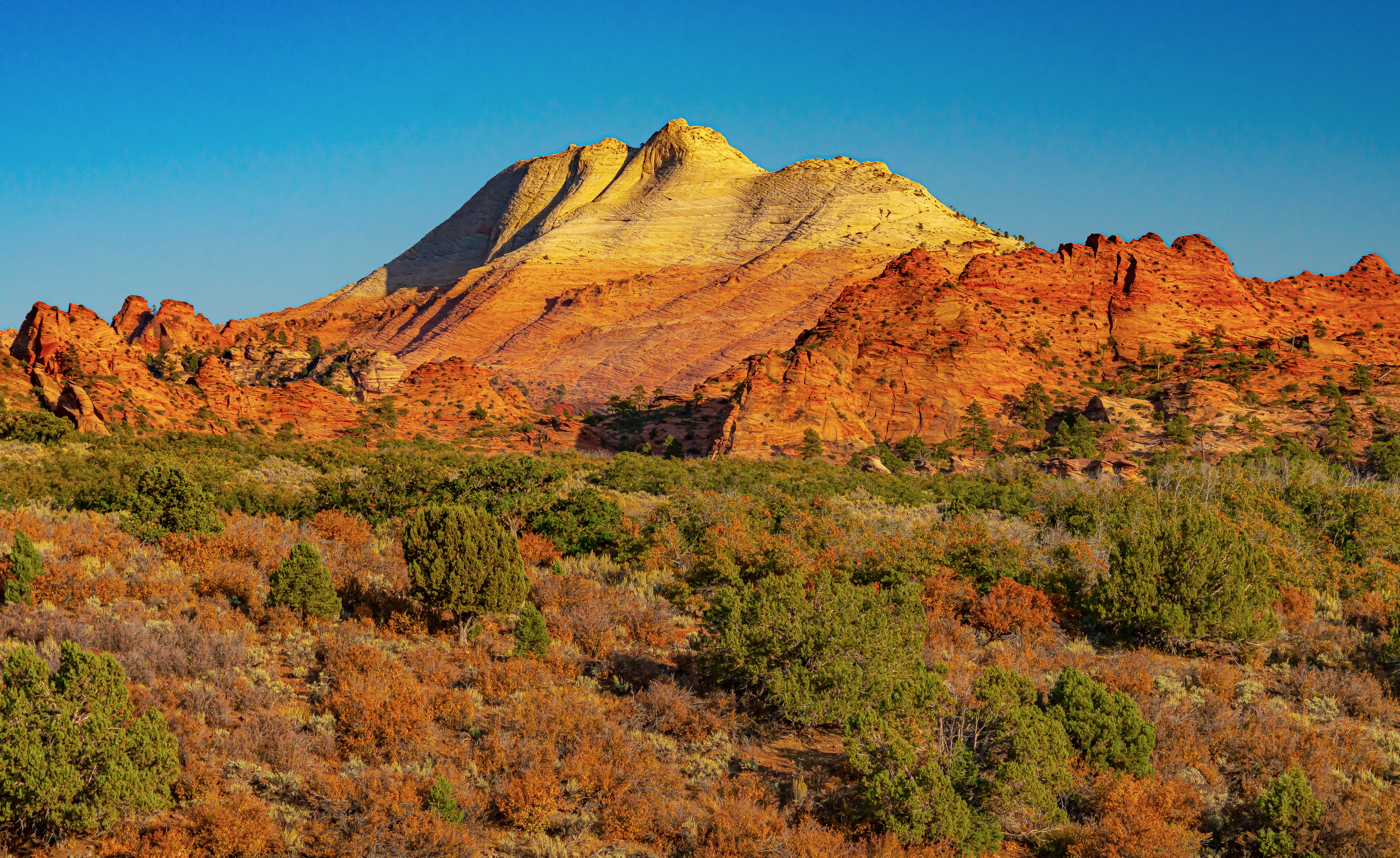

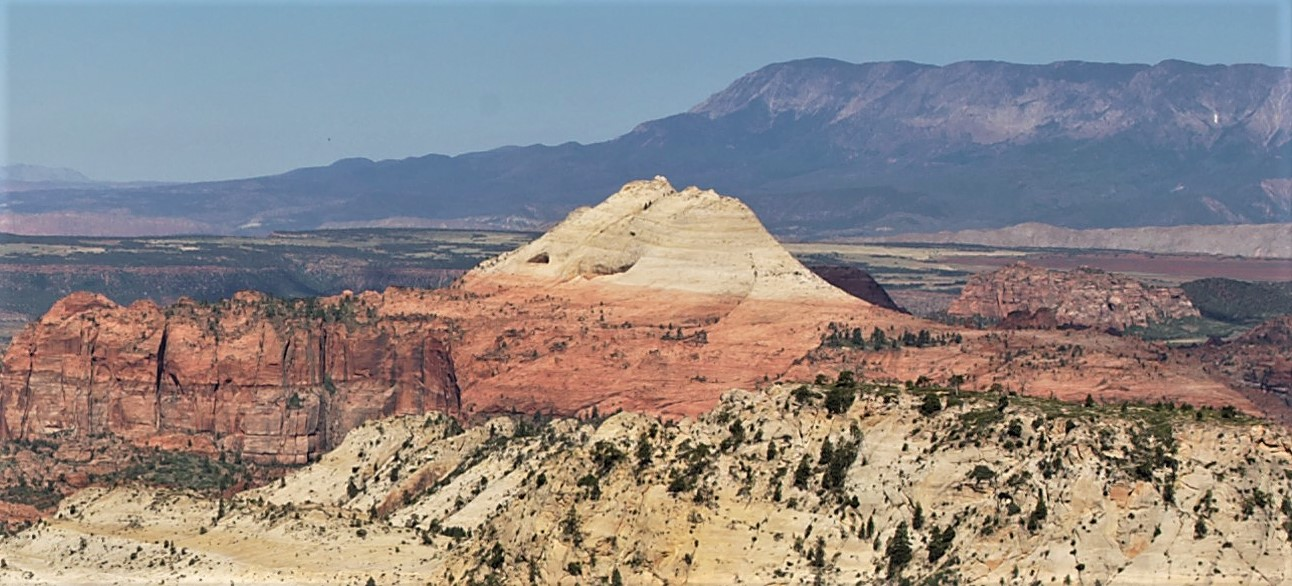
South Guardian Angel, east aspect, from West Rim Trail

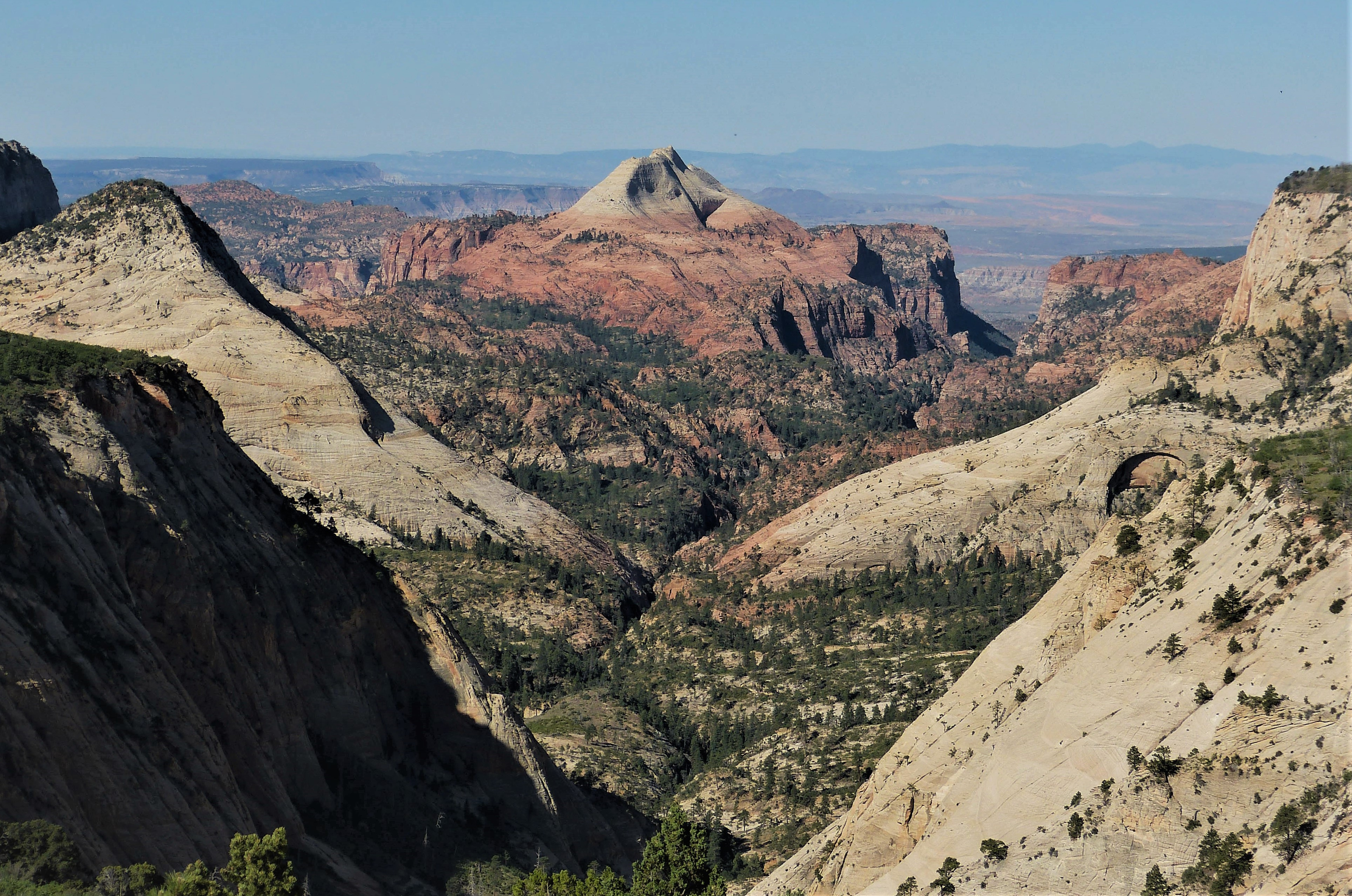
South Guardian Angel from West Rim Trail

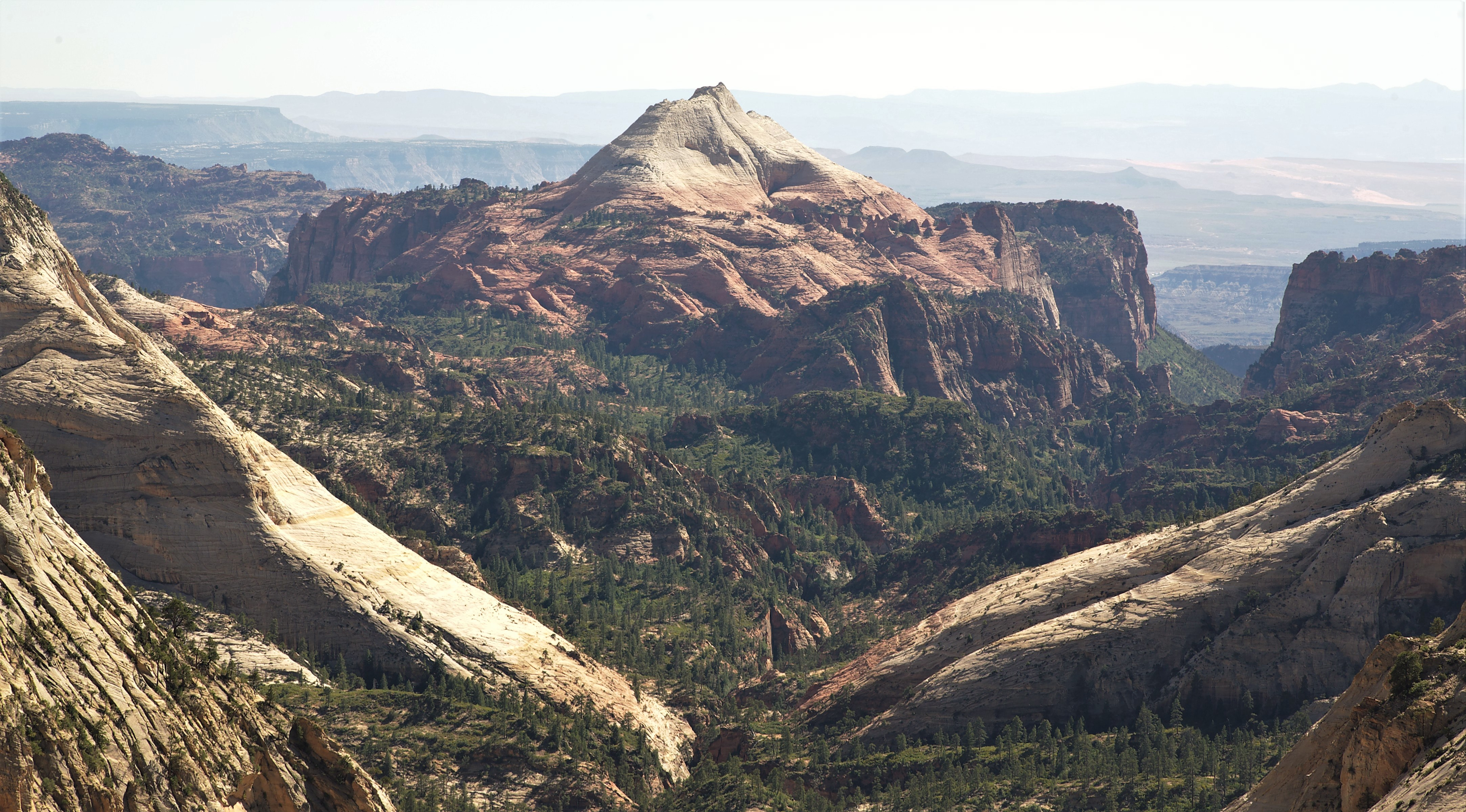
South Guardian Angel from West Rim Trail

== See also ==
- List of mountains in Utah
- Geology of the Zion and Kolob canyons area
- Colorado Plateau
