= North Guardian Angel =

Summit in the state of Utah

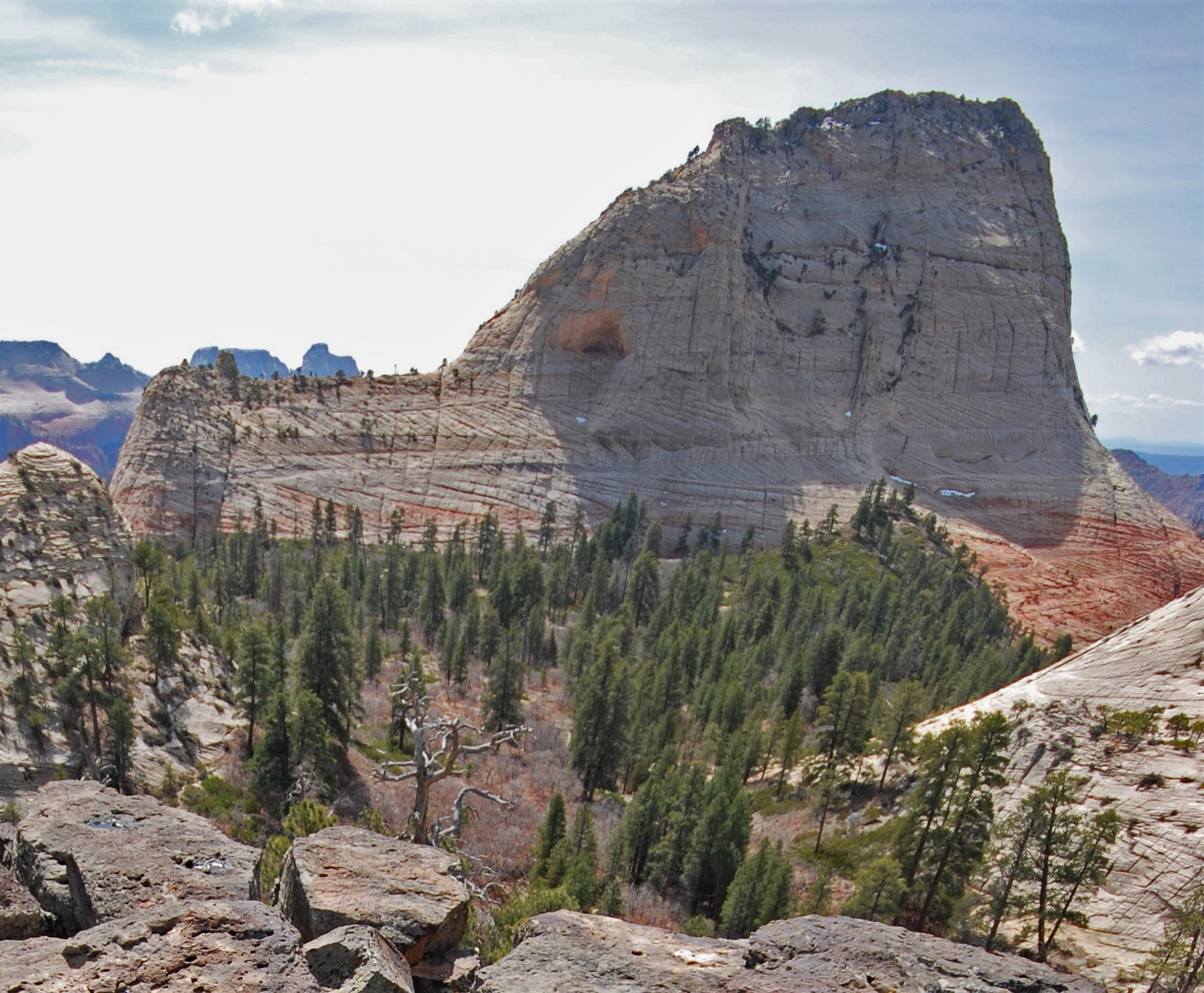
- North aspect

Highest point
- Elevation: 7,395 ft (2,254 m)
- Prominence: 675 ft (206 m)
- Parent peak: Pine Valley Peak (7,415 ft)
- Isolation: 1.72 mi (2.77 km)
- Coordinates: 37°18′59″N 113°03′30″W

Geography
- Location within Utah Location within the United States
- Country: United States
- State: Utah
- County: Washington
- Protected area: Zion National Park
- Parent range: Colorado Plateau
- Topo map: USGS The Guardian Angels

Geology
- Rock age: Jurassic
- Rock type: Navajo sandstone

Climbing
- Easiest route: class 4 scrambling

North Guardian Angel is a 7,395-foot (2,254 meters) elevation summit located in Zion National Park, in Washington County of southwest Utah, United States.

== Description ==
North Guardian Angel, a formation composed of white Navajo Sandstone, is situated 9.5 mi (15.3 km) north-northwest of Springdale, Utah. Its nearest neighbor is South Guardian Angel, 1.44 mi (2 km) to the south. The Subway, a small, uniquely-shaped slot canyon, is set between these two peaks. The North Guardian Angel name was officially adopted in 1934 by the U.S. Board on Geographic Names. Precipitation runoff from this mountain drains into North Creek, a tributary of the Virgin River.

== Climate ==
Spring and fall are the most favorable seasons to visit North Guardian Angel. According to the Köppen climate classification system, it is located in a Cold semi-arid climate zone, which is defined by the coldest month having an average mean temperature below 32 °F (0 °C), and at least 50% of the total annual precipitation being received during the spring and summer. This desert climate receives less than 10 inches (250 millimeters) of annual rainfall, and snowfall is generally light during the winter.

== Gallery ==
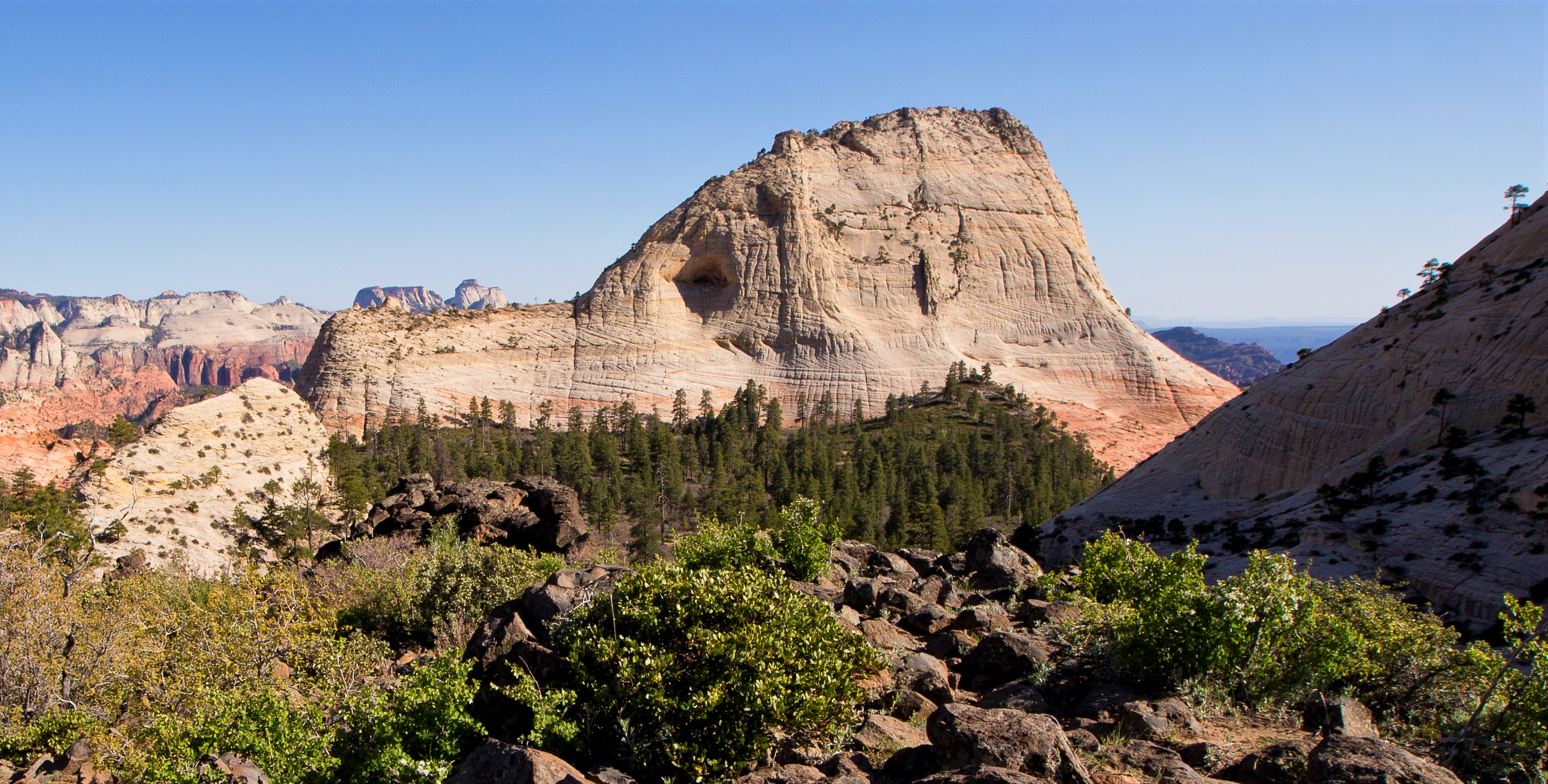
North aspect

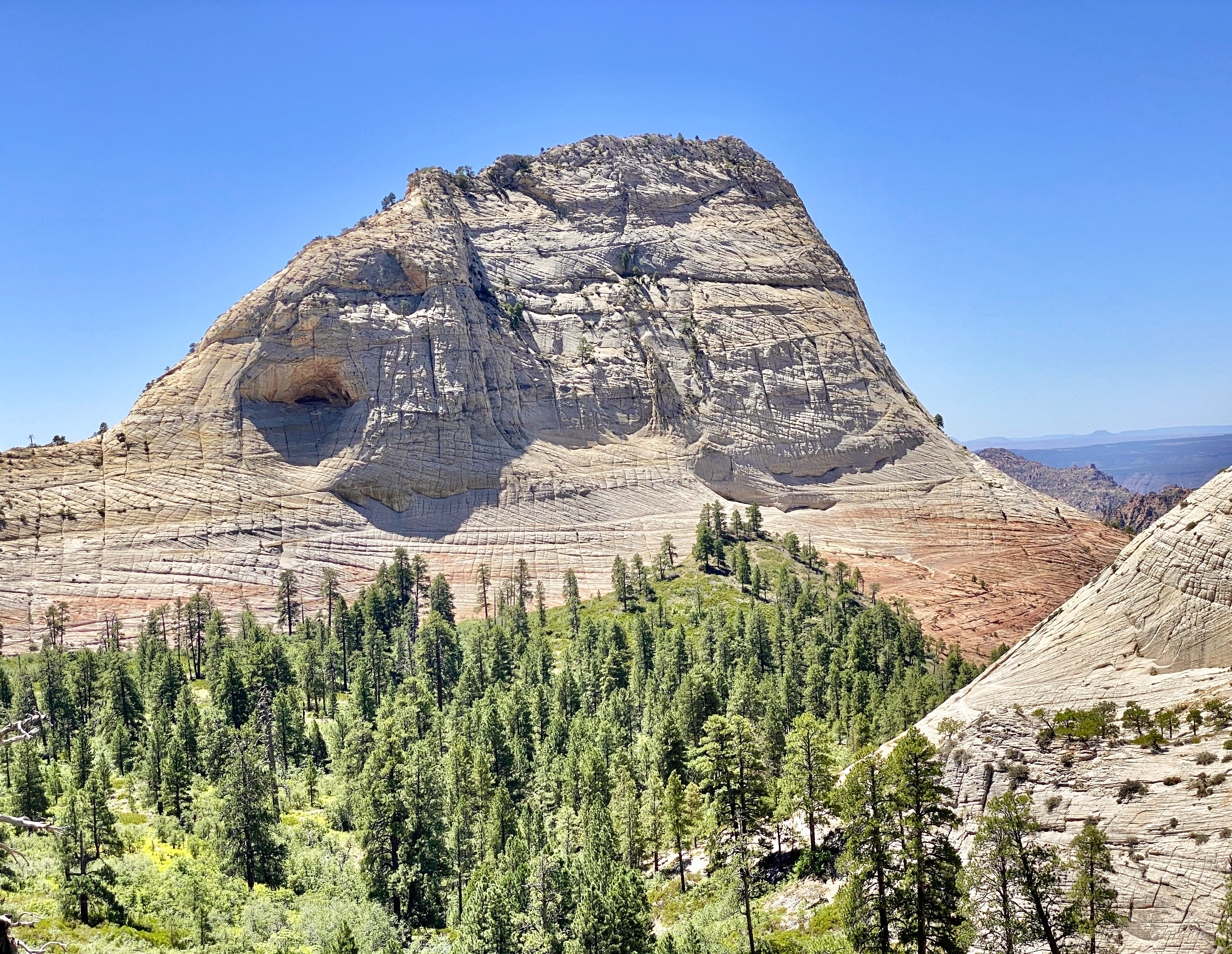
North Guardian Angel viewed from Northgate Peaks Trail

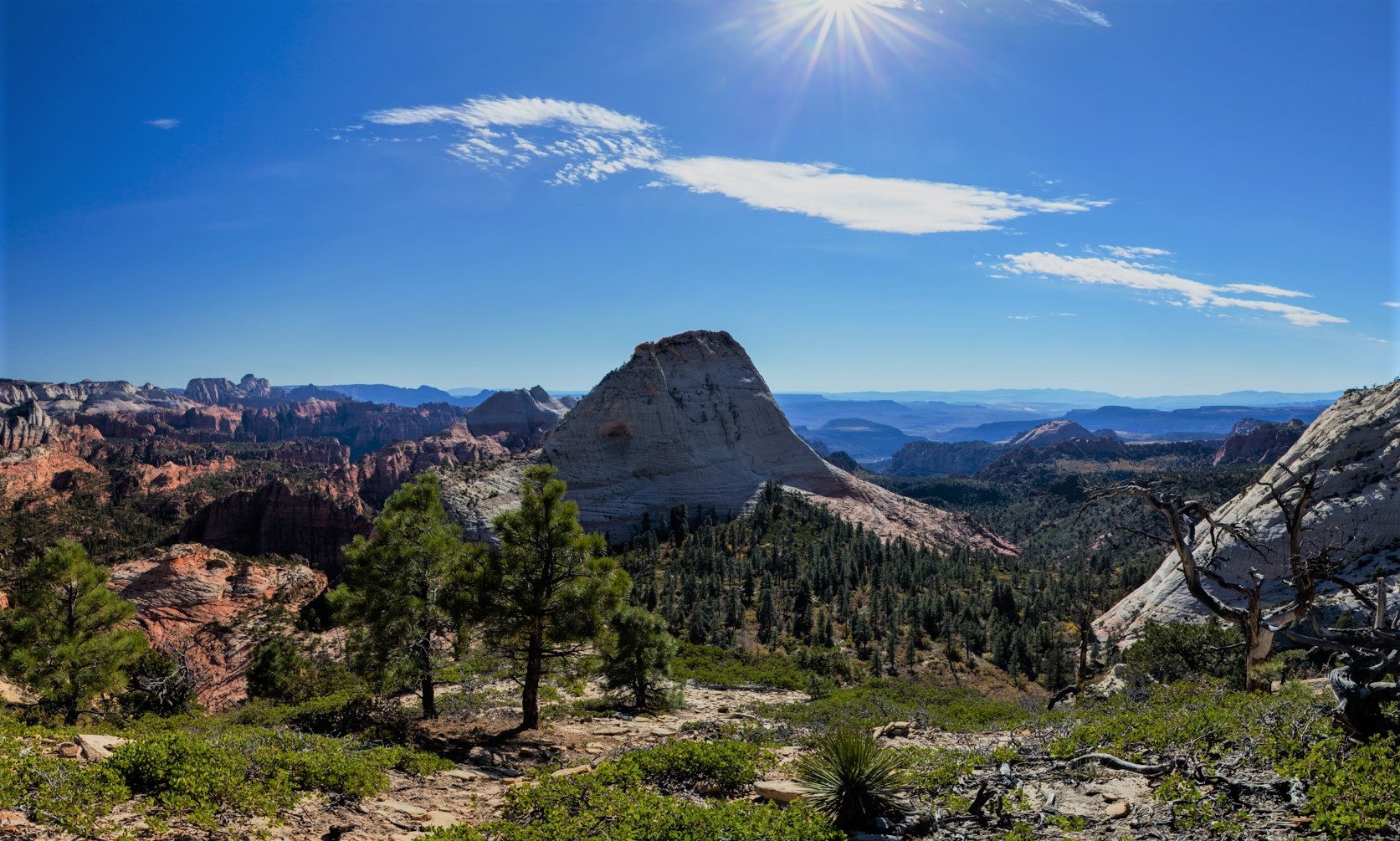
North Guardian Angel from northeast

== See also ==
- Geology of the Zion and Kolob canyons area
- Northgate Peaks
