= Sinking Ship (Grand Canyon) =

Landform in the Grand Canyon, Arizona

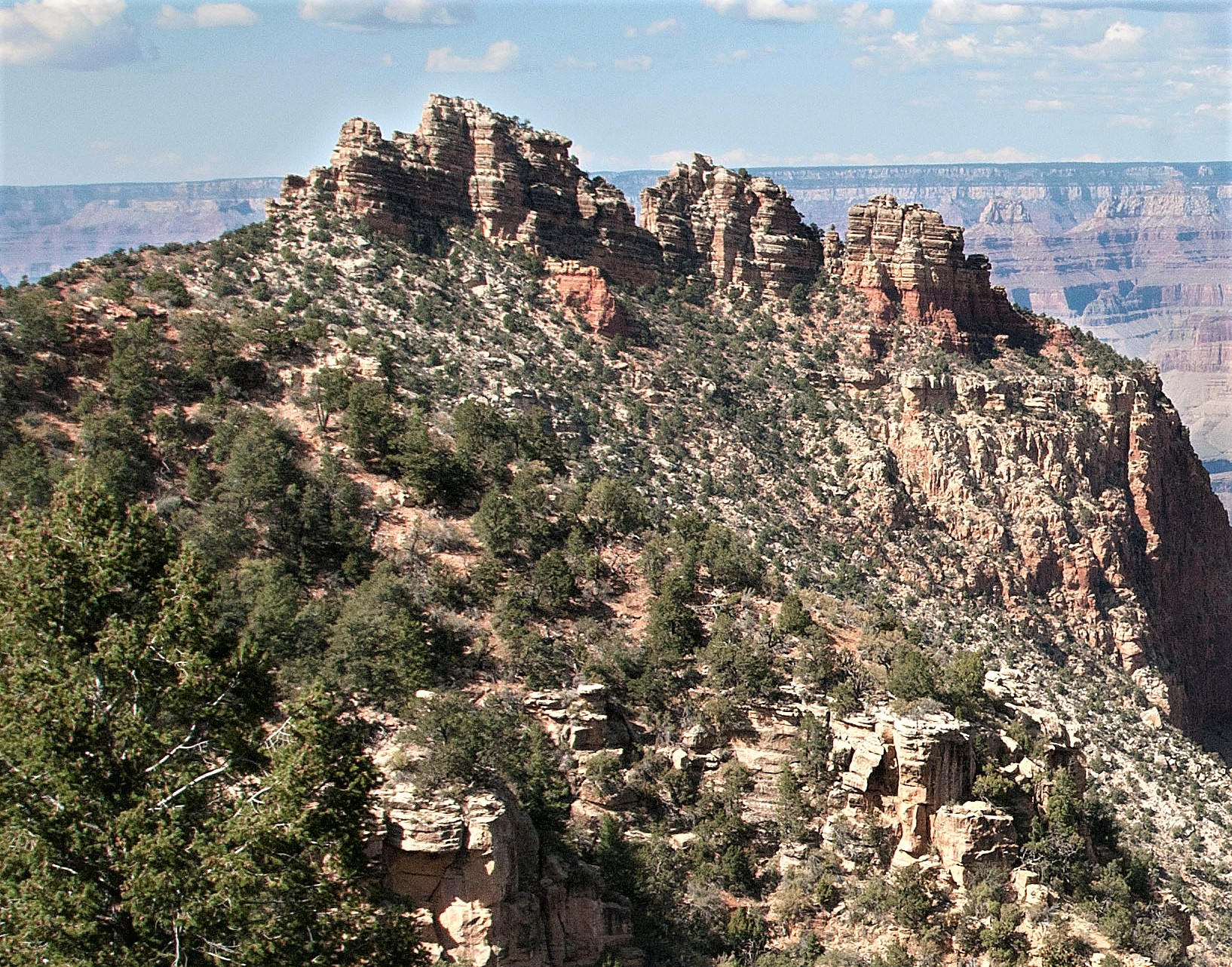
- Sinking Ship, aka Three Castles

Highest point
- Elevation: 7,344 ft (2,238 m)
- Prominence: 304 ft (93 m)
- Parent peak: Grandview Benchmark (7,530 ft)
- Isolation: 2.30 mi (3.70 km)
- Coordinates: 35°59′26″N 111°57′32″W

Geography
- Location within Arizona Location within the United States
- Country: United States
- State: Arizona
- County: Coconino
- Protected area: Grand Canyon National Park
- Parent range: Coconino Plateau; Colorado Plateau
- Topo map: USGS Grandview Point

Geology
- Rock type(s): limestone, sandstone, mudstone

Climbing
- Easiest route: class 4 scrambling

Sinking Ship is a 7,344-foot (2,238 m) elevation summit located in the Grand Canyon, in Coconino County of northern Arizona, United States. This butte is situated 1.7 miles (2.7 km) southeast of the Grandview Point overlook on the canyon's South Rim, and 1.25 miles (2.01 km) southwest of Coronado Butte. Topographic relief is significant as it rises 4,800 feet (1,500 m) above the Colorado River in 4 miles (6.4 km). According to the Köppen climate classification system, Sinking Ship is located in a cold semi-arid climate zone.

== Etymology ==
This geographical feature was named "Three Castles" before its present name was officially adopted in 1932 by the U.S. Board on Geographic Names. The descriptive name is because the dip or tilt of the strata, caused by bending movement of the rock, creates the appearance of a ship sinking into the canyon. The name is attributable to M. R. (Miner Raymond) Tillotson (1886–1955), superintendent of Grand Canyon National Park from 1922 to 1938.

== Geology ==
The summit of Sinking Ship is composed of Kaibab Limestone caprock overlaying cream-colored, cliff-forming, Permian Coconino Sandstone. The sandstone, which is the third-youngest of the strata in the Grand Canyon, was deposited 265 million years ago as sand dunes. Below the Coconino Sandstone is slope-forming, Permian Hermit Formation, which in turn overlays the Pennsylvanian-Permian Supai Group. Further down are strata of Mississippian Redwall Limestone, and Cambrian Tonto Group. Whereas most strata of the Grand Canyon are normally horizontal, at Sinking Ship the strata have been shifted by the Cremation Fault and a monocline. This Precambrian fault was dormant until reawakened during the Laramide orogeny. The eastward tilt of Sinking Ship is due to its position astride the axis of the Grandview-Phantom monocline. Precipitation runoff from Sinking Ship drains north into the nearby Colorado River via Hance Creek.

== Gallery ==
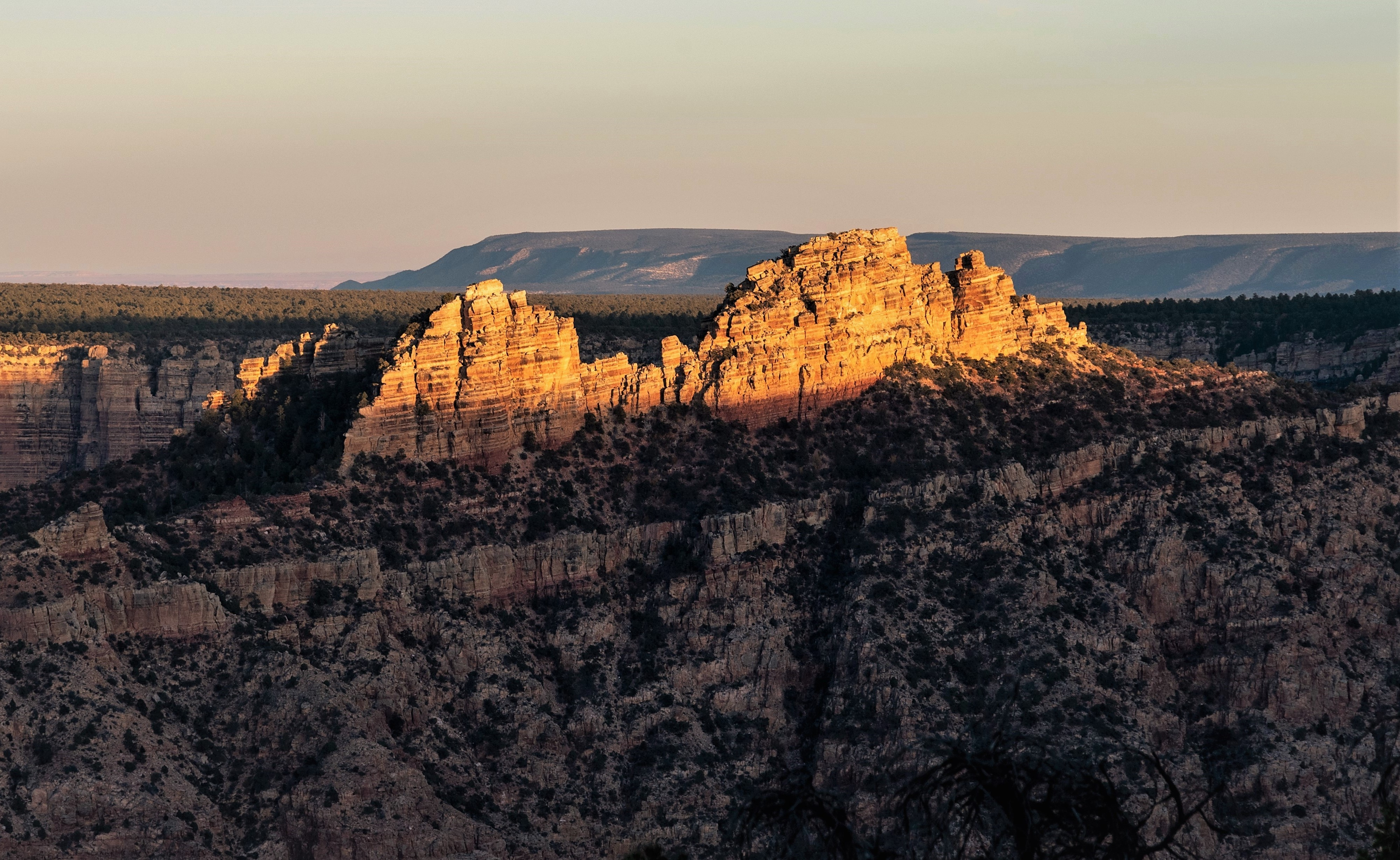
Sunset illuminating Sinking Ship

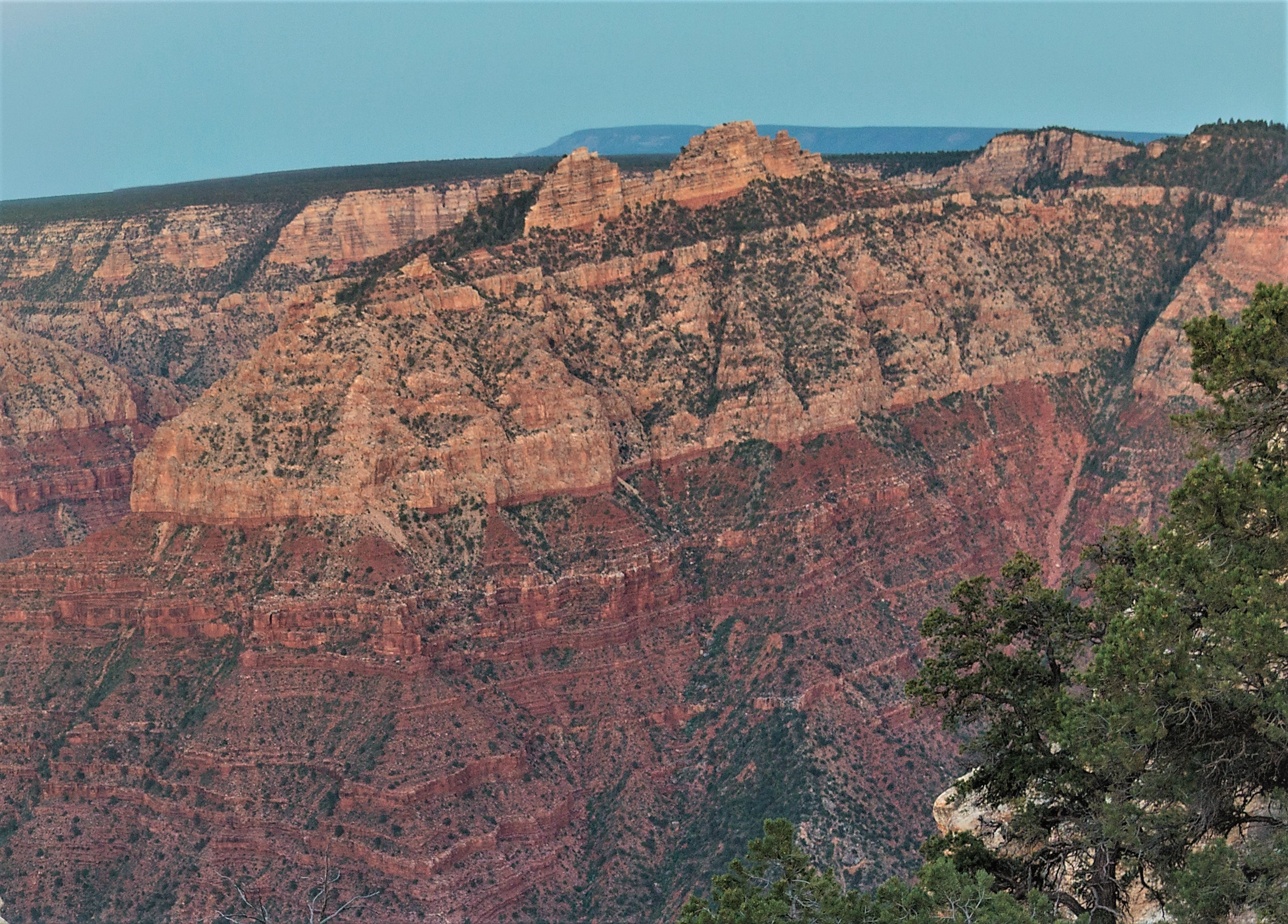
West aspect from Grandview Point

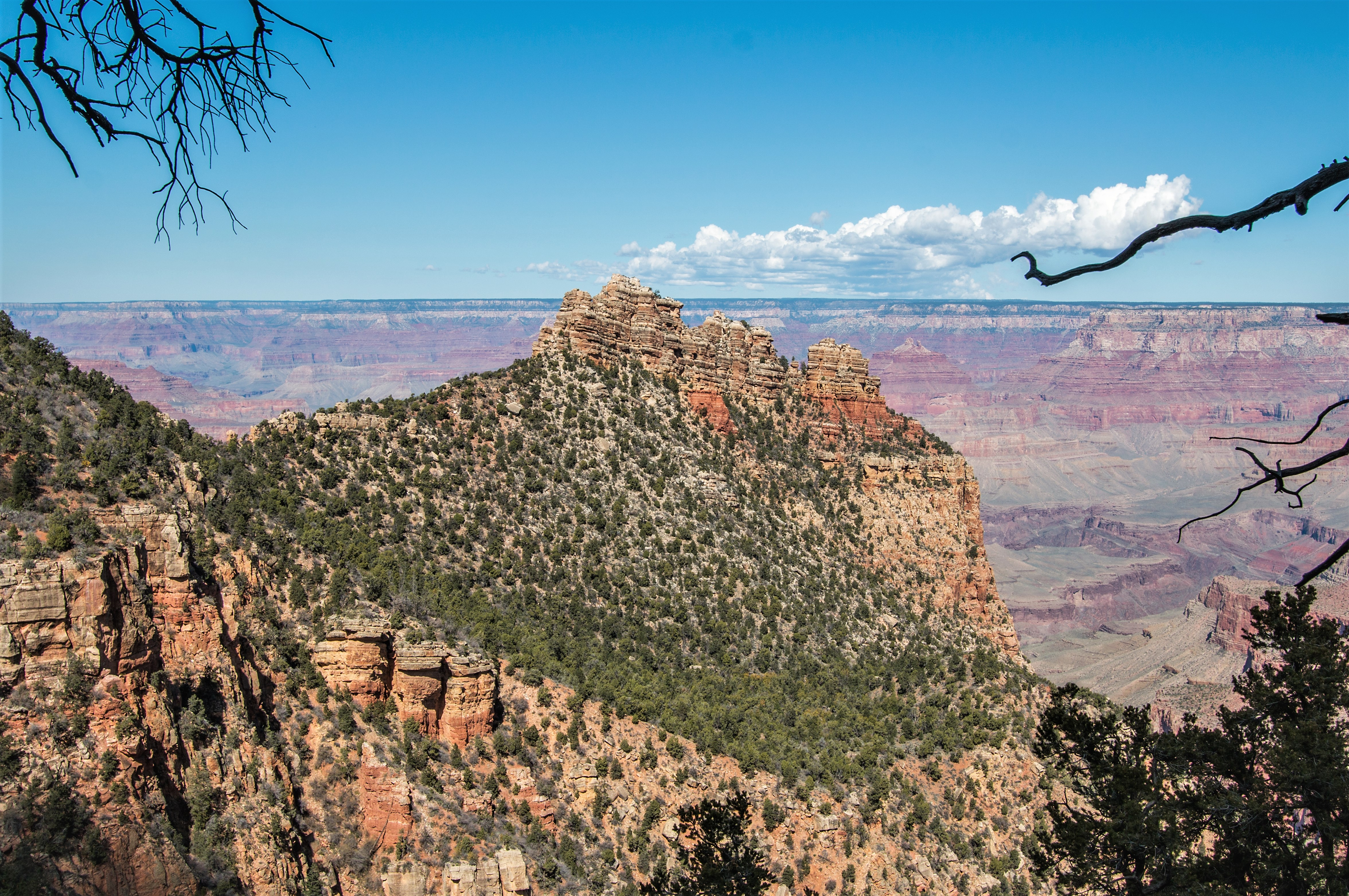
From the southeast.

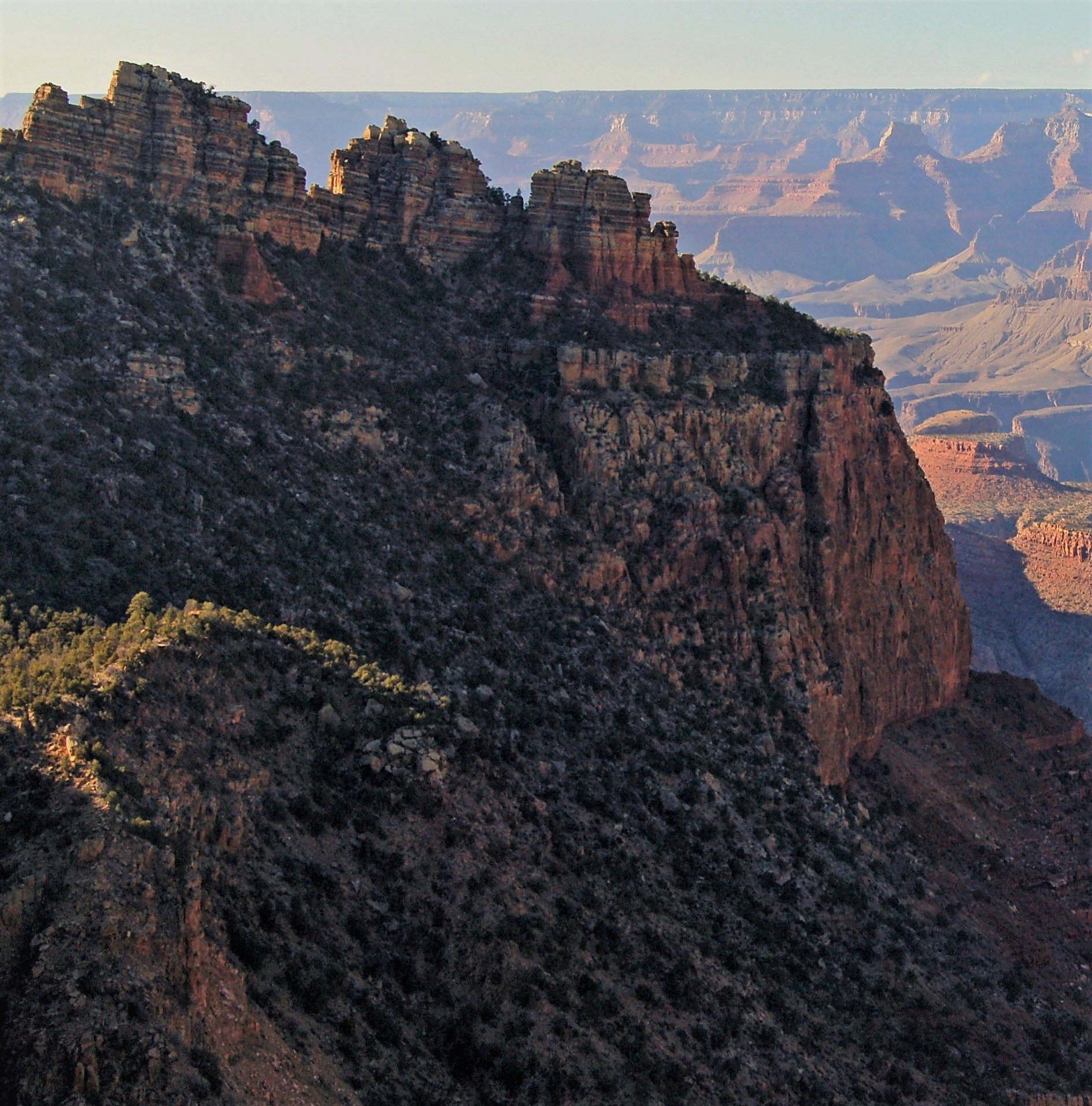
Sinking Ship, looking like "Three Castles"

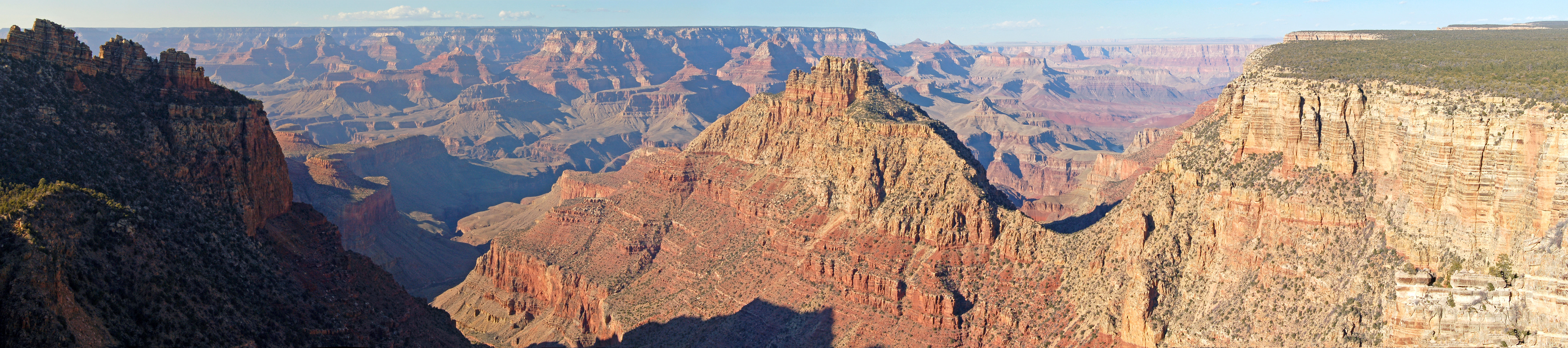
Coronado Butte centered, with Sinking Ship to left and shaded.

== See also ==
- Geology of the Grand Canyon area
- The Battleship (Grand Canyon)
