= Coronado Butte =

Landform in the Grand Canyon, Arizona

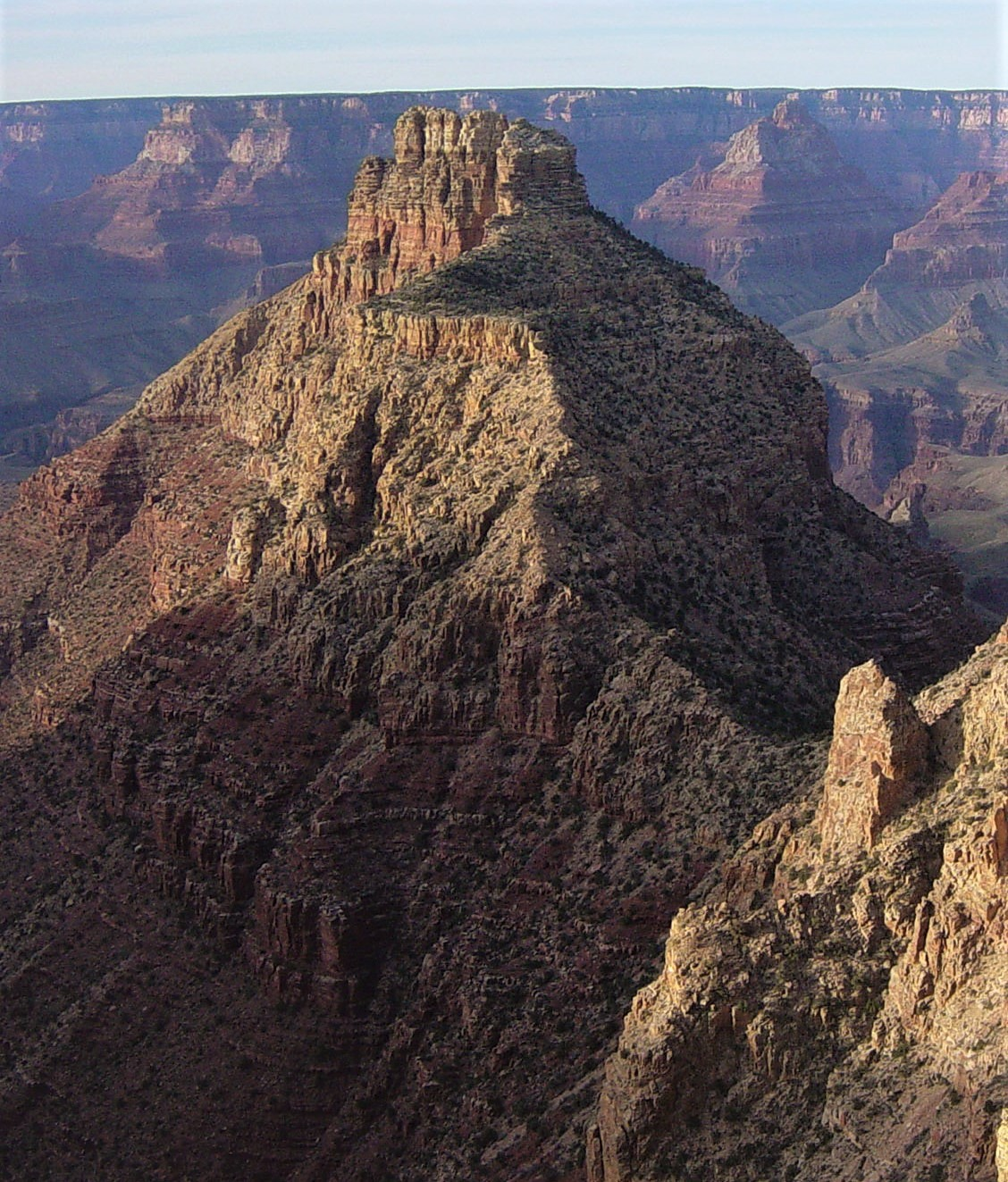

Highest point
- Elevation: 7,162 ft (2,183 m)
- Prominence: 1,122 ft (342 m)
- Parent peak: Sinking Ship (7,344 ft)
- Isolation: 1.25 mi (2.01 km)
- Coordinates: 36°00′14″N 111°56′37″W

Geography
- Location within Arizona Location within the United States
- Country: United States
- State: Arizona
- County: Coconino
- Protected area: Grand Canyon National Park
- Parent range: Coconino Plateau; Colorado Plateau
- Topo map: USGS Cape Royal

Geology
- Rock type(s): sandstone, siltstone, mudstone

Climbing
- First ascent: 1890s
- Easiest route: class 3+ scrambling

Coronado Butte is a 7,162-foot (2,183 m)-elevation summit located in the Grand Canyon, in Coconino County of Arizona, United States. It is situated one mile (1.6 km) west of the Moran Point overlook on the canyon's South Rim, and one mile northeast of Sinking Ship, its nearest higher neighbor. Topographic relief is significant as this butte rises 4,600 feet (1,400 m) above the Colorado River in 2.5 miles (4.0 km). Coronado Butte is named for Francisco Vázquez de Coronado (1510–1554), the explorer whose 1540 expedition was the first European sighting of the Grand Canyon, among other landmarks. This geographical feature's name was officially adopted in 1906 by the U.S. Board on Geographic Names. The first ascent was made by John Hance and tourist prior to 1900, in the 1890s. According to the Köppen climate classification system, Coronado Butte is located in a cold semi-arid climate zone.

== Geology ==
The summit of Coronado Butte is composed of cream-colored, cliff-forming, Permian Coconino Sandstone with a Kaibab Limestone caprock. The sandstone, which is the third-youngest of the strata in the Grand Canyon, was deposited 265 million years ago as sand dunes. Below the Coconino Sandstone is slope-forming, Permian Hermit Formation, which in turn overlays the Pennsylvanian-Permian Supai Group. Further down are strata of Mississippian Redwall Limestone, and Cambrian Tonto Group. Precipitation runoff from Coronado Butte drains north into the nearby Colorado River.

== Gallery ==
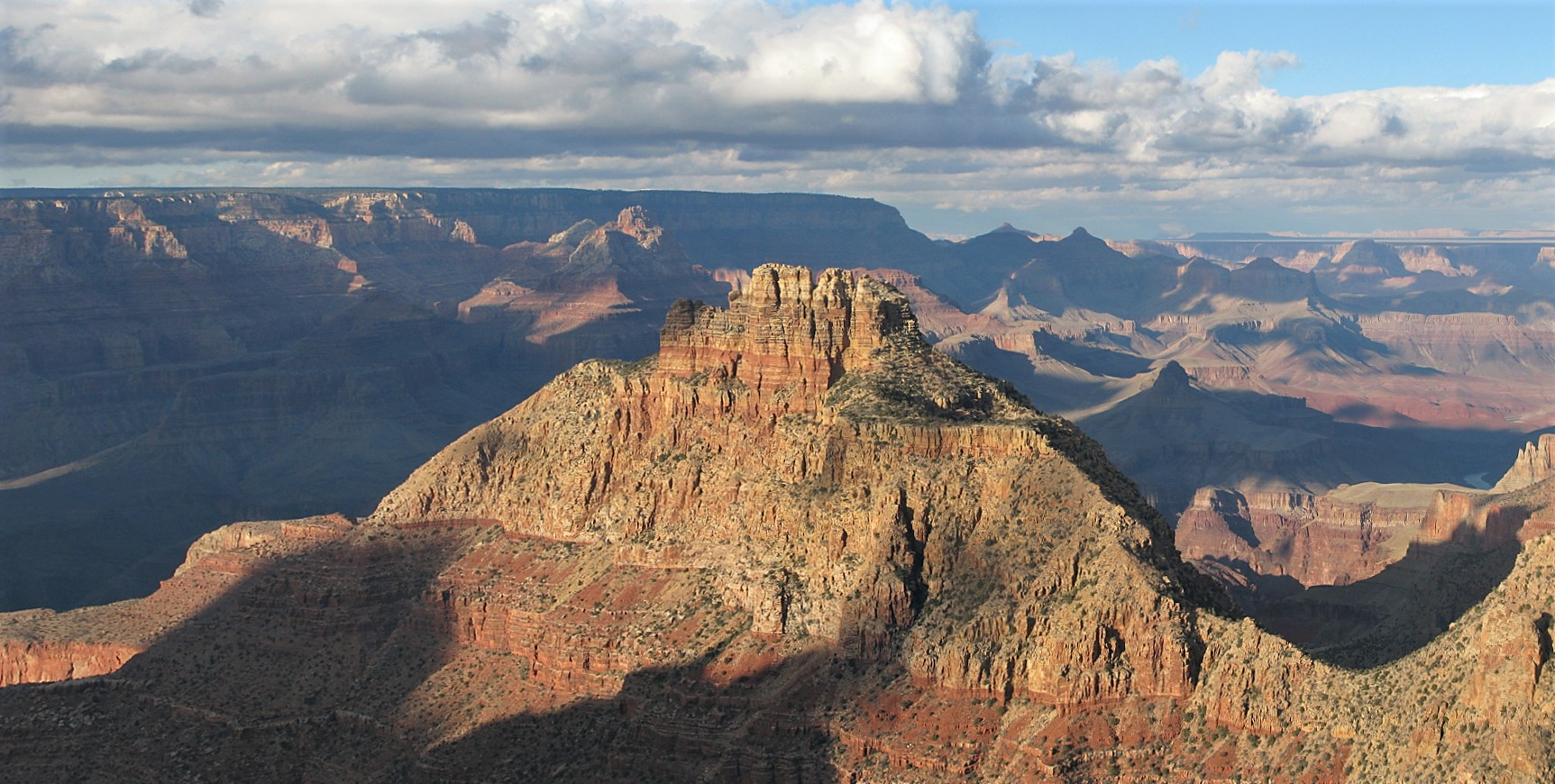
South aspect

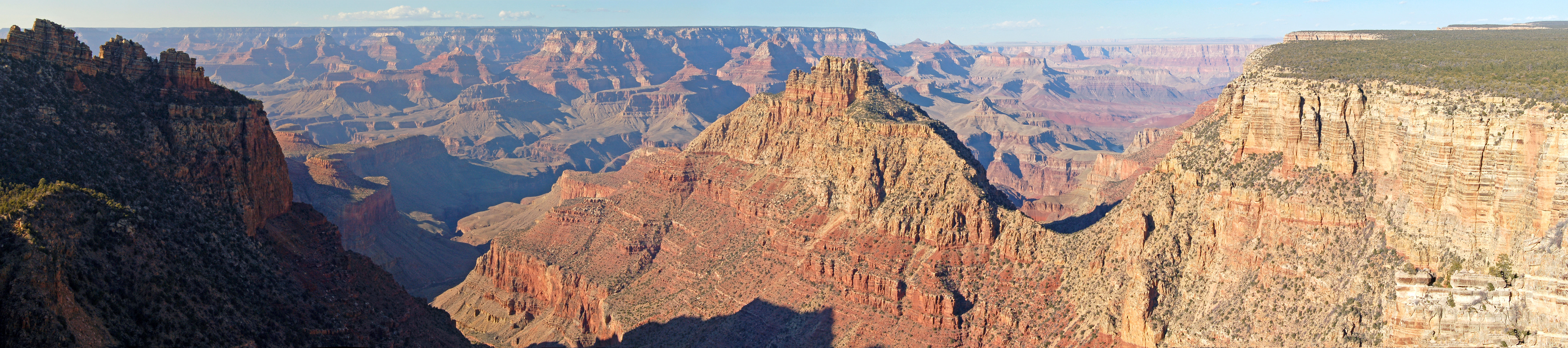
Coronado Butte centered, with parent Sinking Ship to left

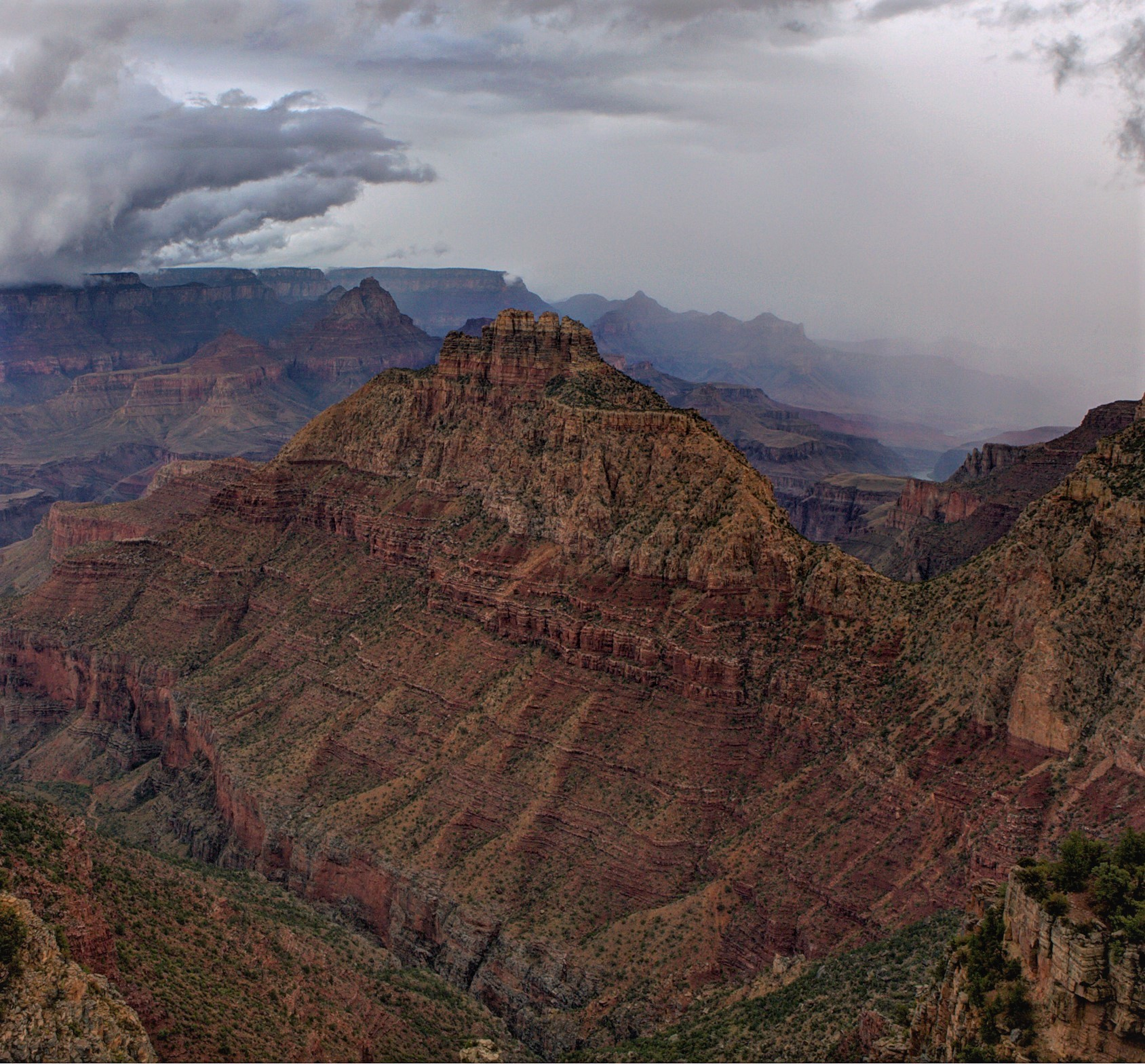
Viewed from near the Buggeln picnic area

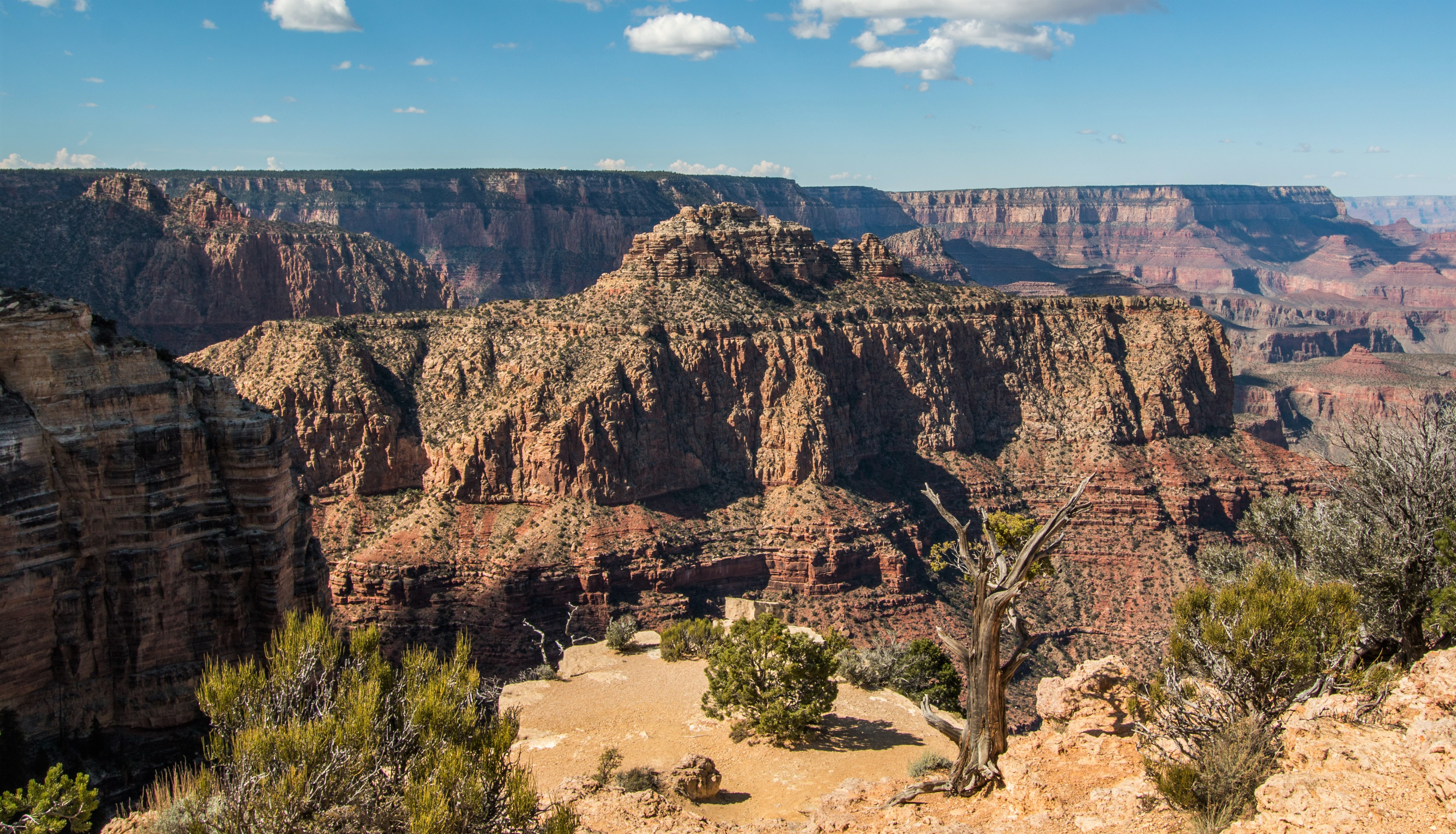
Coronado Butte from Moran Point

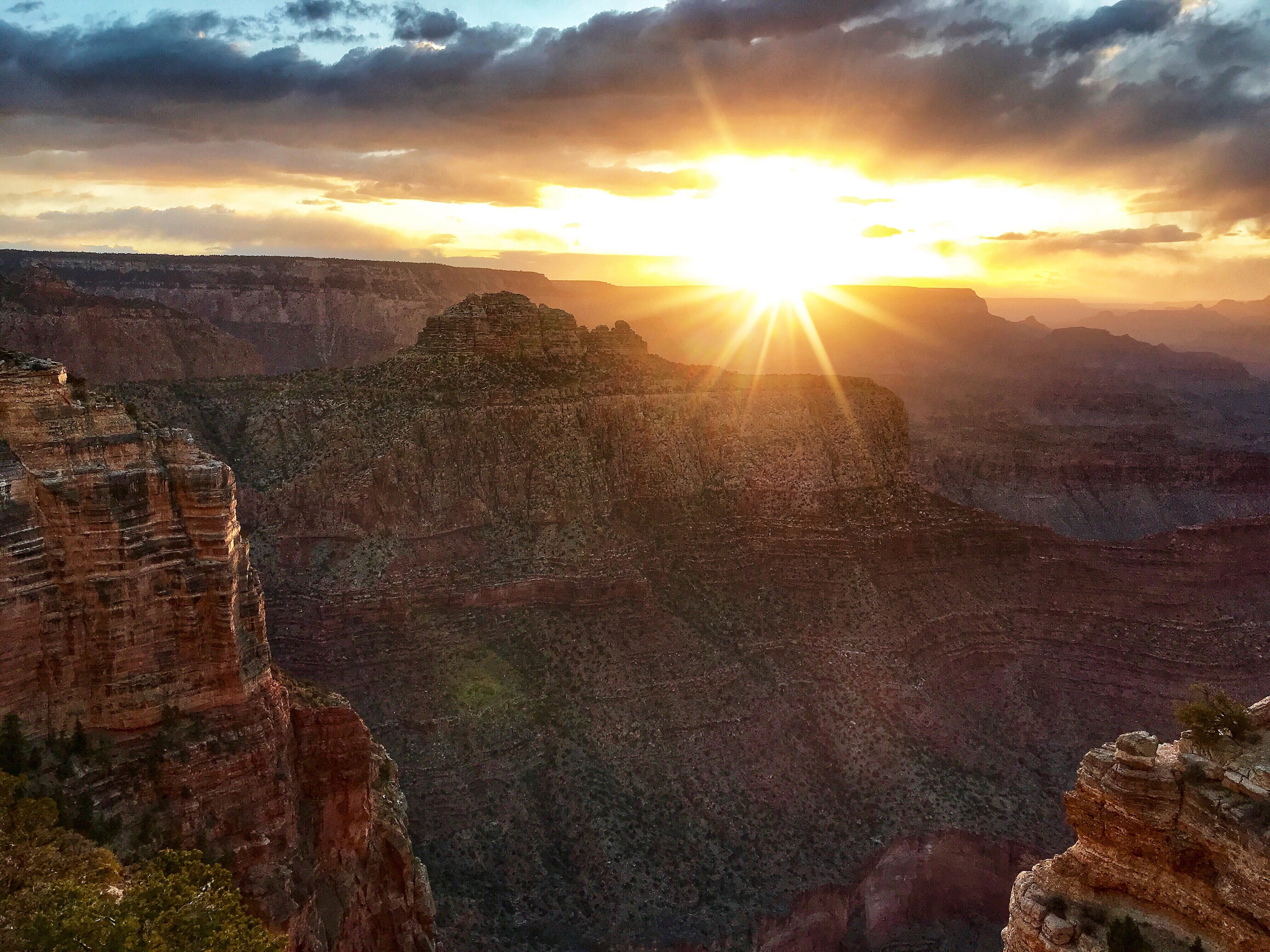
Sunset on Coronado Butte

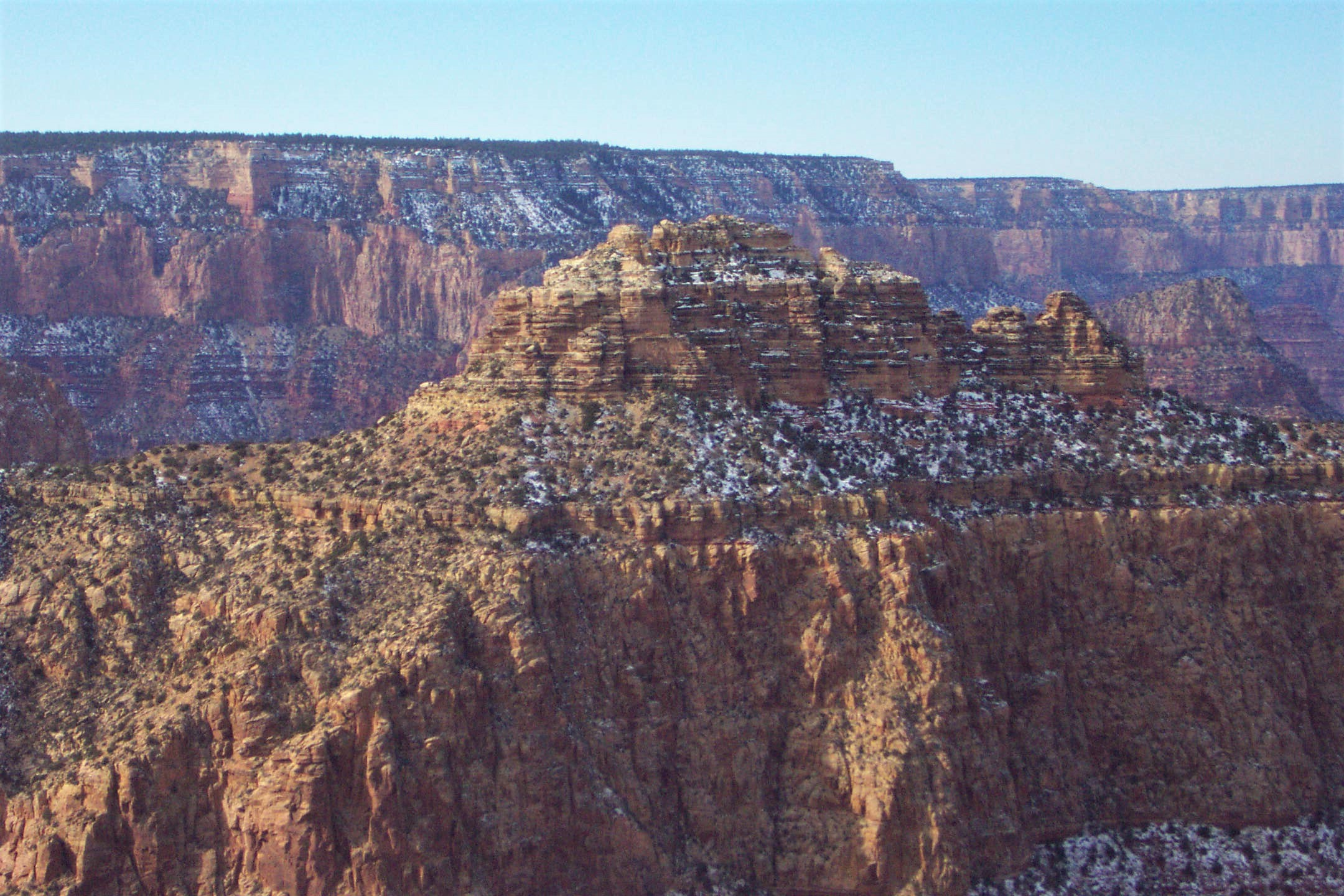
East aspect, from Moran Point

== See also ==
- Geology of the Grand Canyon area
