= The Battleship (Grand Canyon) =

Landform in the Grand Canyon, Arizona

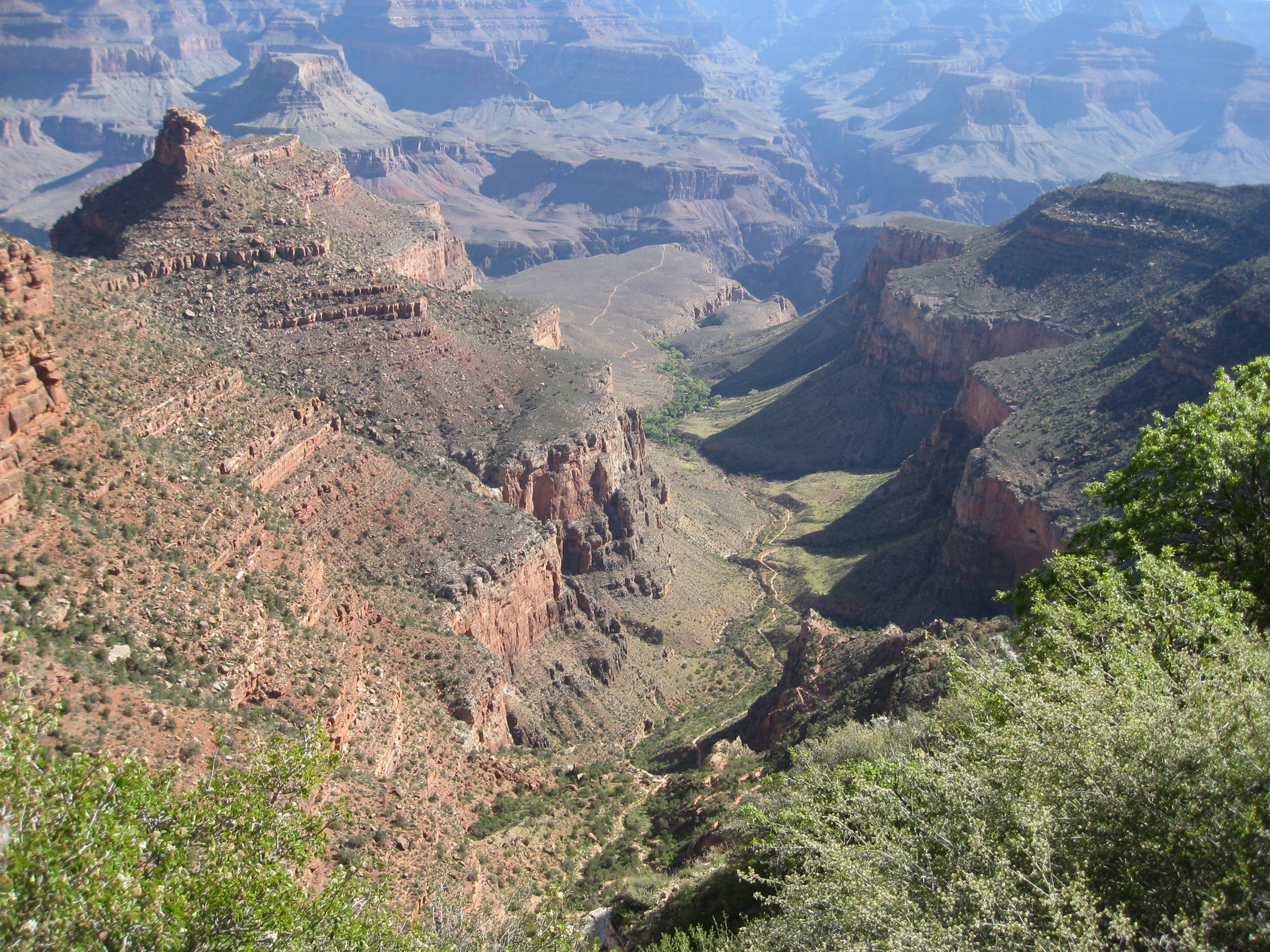

Highest point
- Elevation: 5,850 ft (1,780 m)
- Prominence: 832 ft (254 m)
- Parent peak: Maricopa Point
- Isolation: 0.75 mi (1.21 km)
- Coordinates: 36°04′33″N 112°08′18″W

Geography
- Location within Arizona Location within the United States
- Location: Grand Canyon National Park (Coconino Plateau), Coconino County, Arizona, US
- Parent range: Kaibab Plateau; Colorado Plateau
- Topo map: USGS Grand Canyon

Geology
- Rock age: Permian down to Cambrian
- Mountain type(s): sedimentary rock: sandstone-(prominence-cliff), siltstone, mudstone, limestone, shale
- Rock type(s): Coconino Sandstone, Hermit Shale, Supai Group, Redwall Limestone, Muav Limestone, Bright Angel Shale, Tapeats Sandstone

The Battleship is a 5,850-foot (1,780 m)-elevation summit located in central Grand Canyon, in Coconino County of northern Arizona, United States. The ridgeline, Battleship landform forms part of the western border of Garden Creek Canyon, which contains the Bright Angel Trail down to the Colorado River, and across it to Phantom Ranch. The east border of Garden Creek Canyon is the South Rim, with the overlooks of Grandeur Point and Yavapai Point. The Battleship is 1.5 miles (2.4 km) northwest of Yavapai Point, 1.5 miles due-north of Grand Canyon Village, and roughly 2.0 miles (3.2 km) southwest of the Colorado River.

The long ridgeline of "the battleship", is oriented slightly southwest-by-northeast, with the "conning tower", (The Battleship prominence), at the southwest, making up about one fourth of the battleship landform. The striking west Redwall Limestone cliffs, surmounted by the orange-reddish slopes of Supai Group “redbeds”, of The Battleship landform, is offset at the east, by the same Redwall cliffs and orange-red "redbeds", of the cliffs of the South Rim.

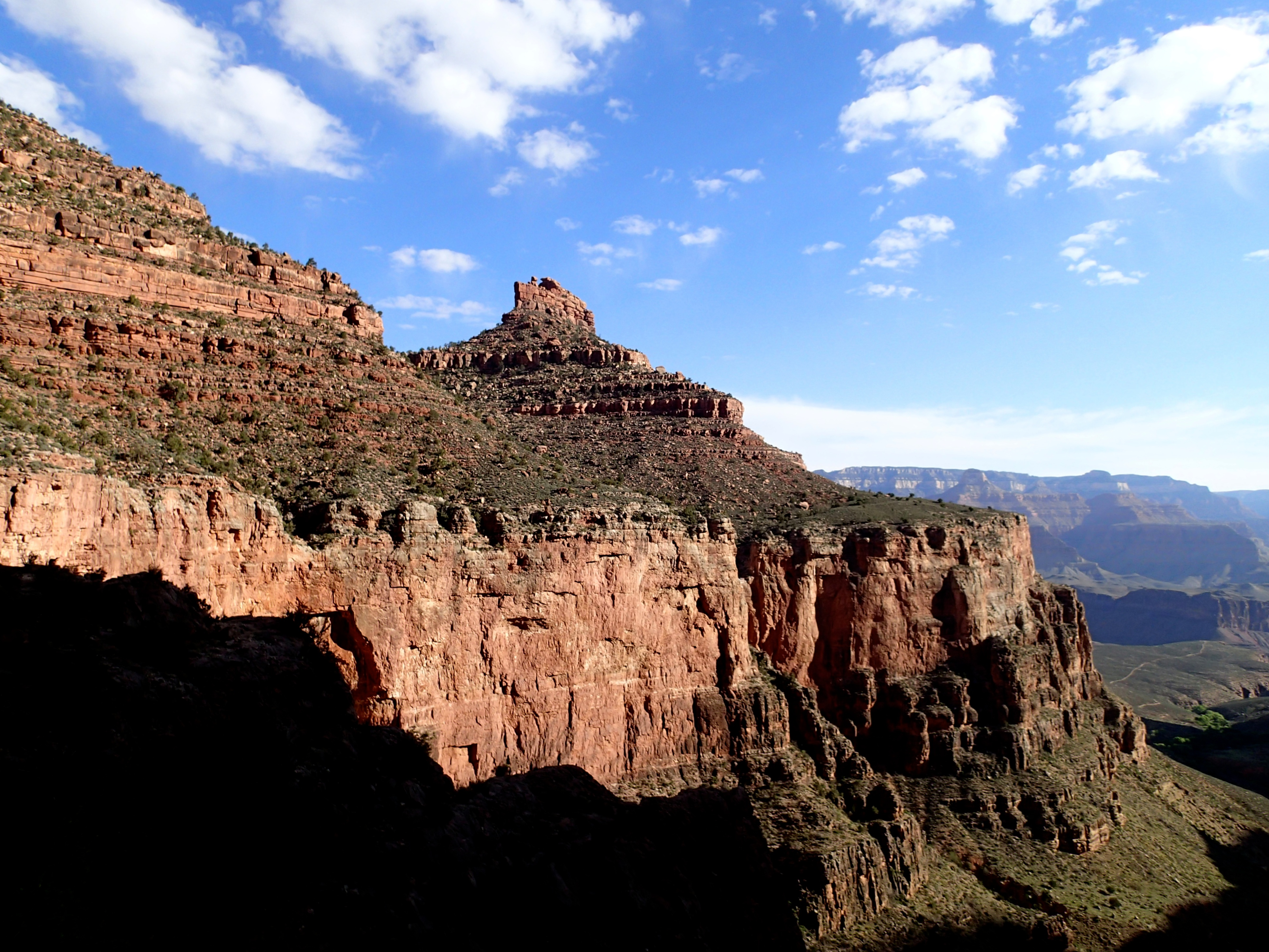

== Geology ==
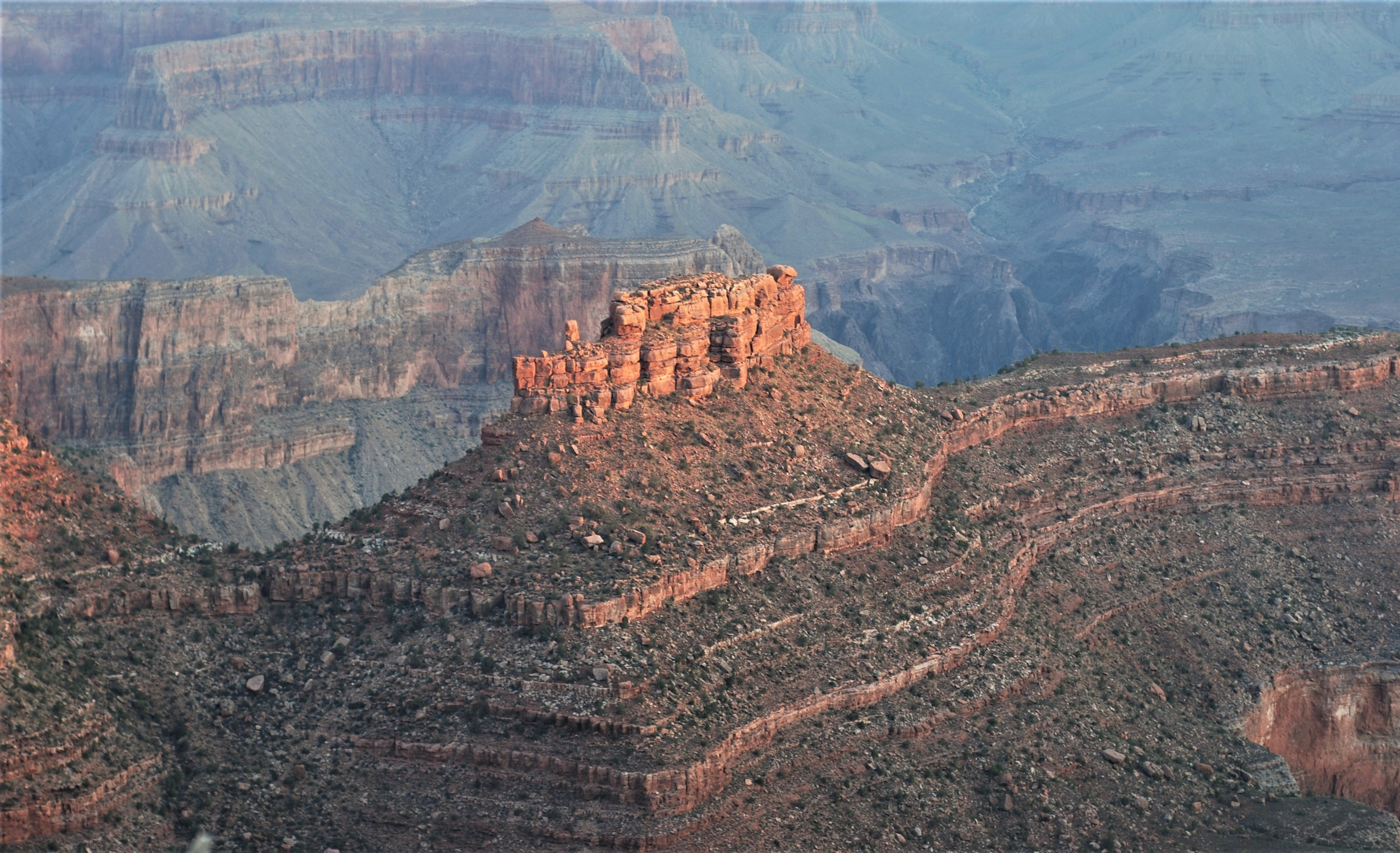
The Battleship at sunrise

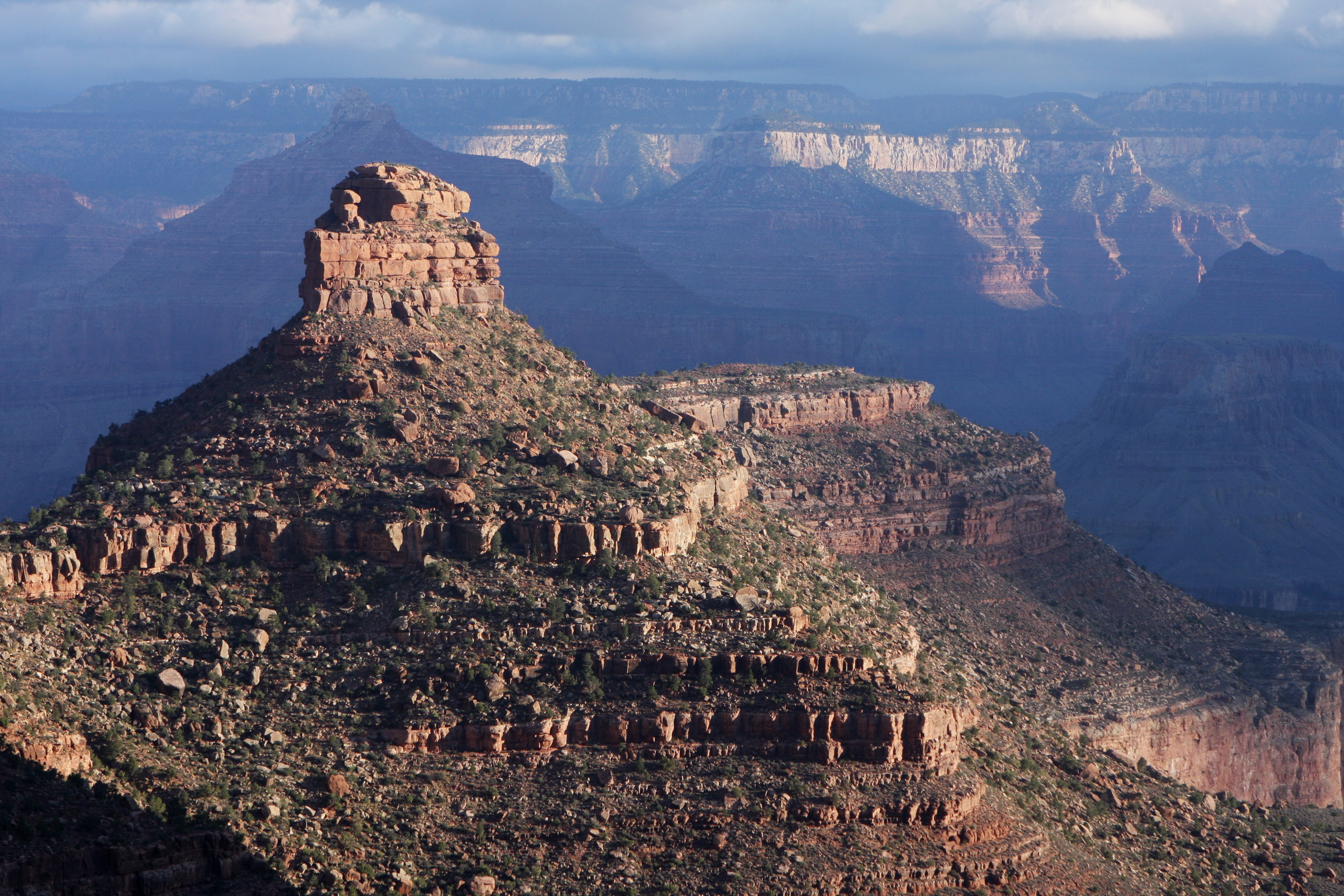
The Battleship peak, and the horizontal "ship surface"

The Battleship prominence is composed of cliffs of Coconino Sandstone, upon short eroded slopes of Hermit Shale. The length of "the battleship" is a cliff-platform of the upper member of the Supai Group, (unit 4, Esplanade Sandstone). The entire 4-member orange-red Supai Group (heavily vegetated), sits on the platform, and tall cliffs of the Redwall Limestone. Below the Redwall cliffs are the Tonto Group members – a short cliff of Muav Limestone, large slopes of Bright Angel Shale, and short cliffs of Tapeats Sandstone.

== See also ==
- Geology of the Grand Canyon area
- Sinking Ship (Grand Canyon)
- Plateau Point
