= Plateau Point =

Landform in the Grand Canyon, Arizona

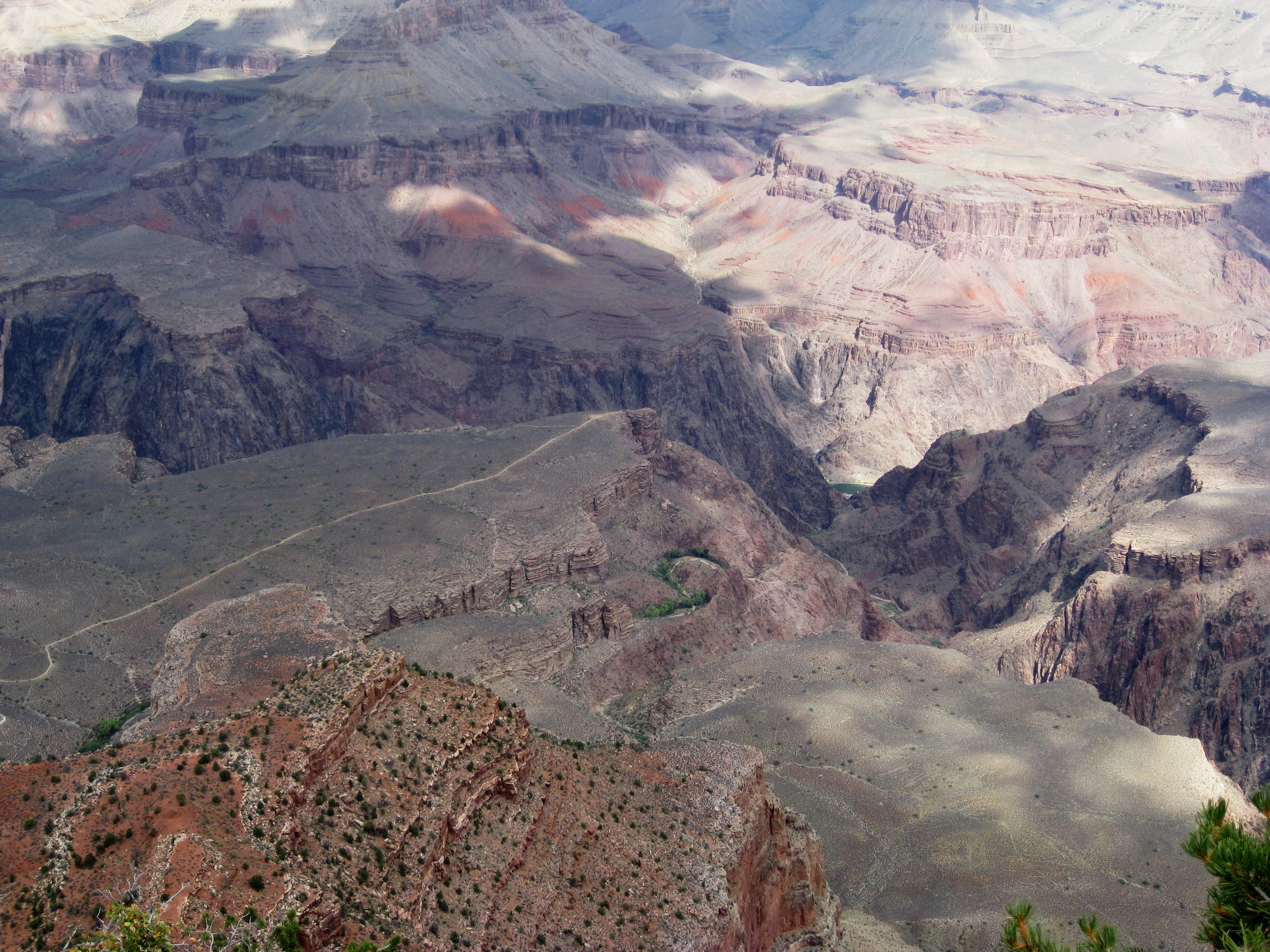
- Plateau Point, with short Plateau Point Trail (viewed over The Battleship landform)

Highest point
- Elevation: 2,789 ft (850 m)
- Prominence: 250 ft (76 m)
- Parent peak: Yavapai Point (6,840 ft)
- Isolation: 2.0 mi (3.2 km)
- Coordinates: 36°05′36″N 112°06′58″W

Geography
- Location within Arizona Location within the United States
- Location: Grand Canyon National Park, Coconino County, Arizona, US
- Parent range: Coconino Plateau; Colorado Plateau
- Topo map: USGS Phantom Ranch

Geology
- Rock age: Cambrian
- Mountain type(s): sedimentary rock: sandstone-(prominence-cliff & plateau-like platform)
- Rock type: Tapeats Sandstone

Plateau Point is a 3,789 ft cliff-elevation point in the Grand Canyon, Coconino County of northern Arizona, United States. It is about 3.0 miles north-northeast of Grand Canyon Village, and about 2.0 miles north of Grandeur and Yavapai Points, and below the South Rim. Plateau Point, (about 1600 ft above the Colorado River), overlooks the outfall intersection of Garden Creek Canyon, and Pipe Creek Canyon, intersecting from the southeast from Mather and Yaki Points. The point is on the Tonto Platform, and is accessed by the short Plateau Point Trail, from the Tonto Trail, which crosses the west of the Plateau Point platform.

Plateau Point sits on the cliff-former (and platform-former) Tapeats Sandstone, which borders the northwest of Garden Creek Canyon (lower canyon), as well as the northeast. The Tapeats Sandstone sits on rocks of the Great Unconformity, the 1,000 my layer of missing rock and time.

== Geology: Tapeats Sandstone, the Tonto Platform ==
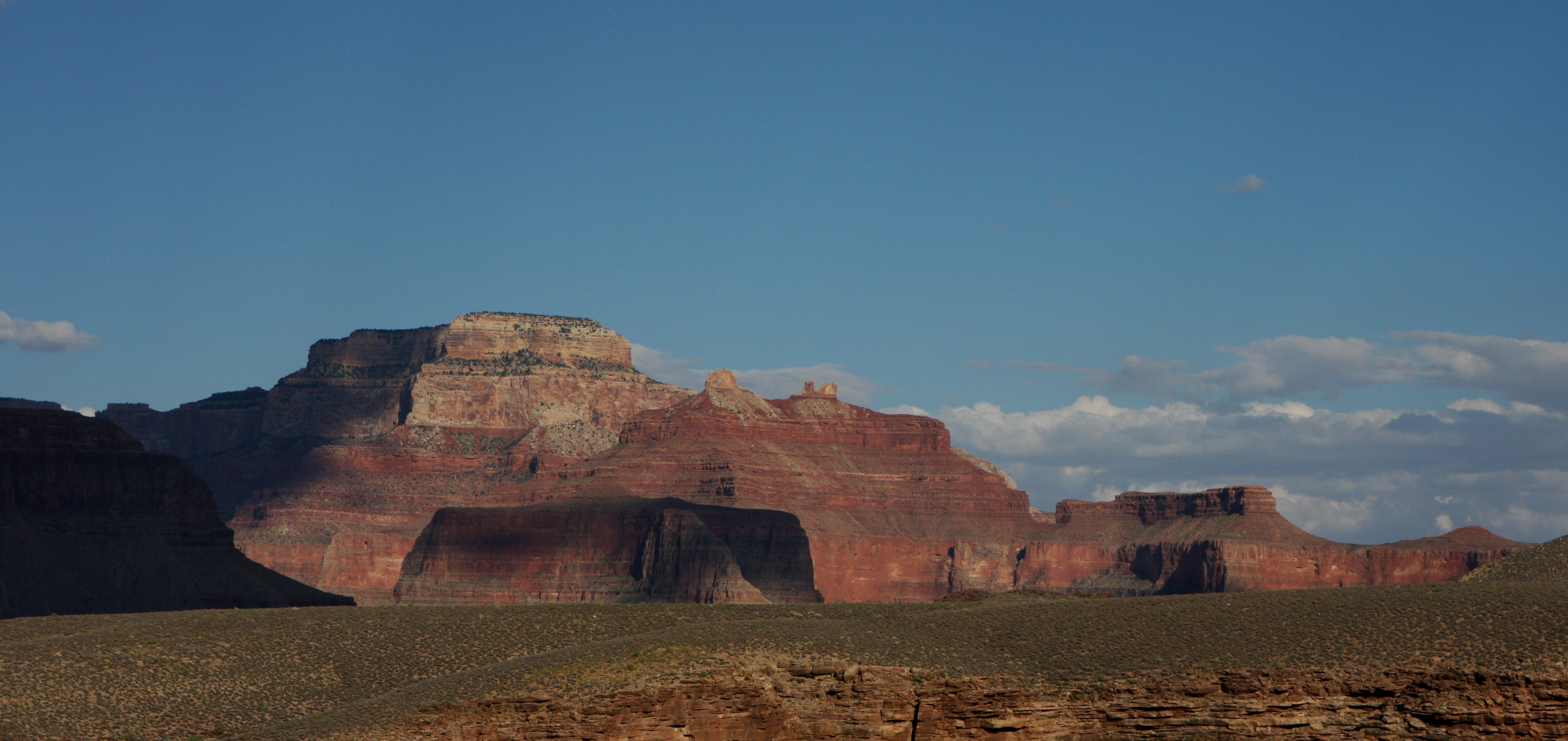
the Plateau Point platform, created by cliff-former (& platform-former), Tapeats Sandstone The landforms across Granite Gorge & the Colorado River are: Isis Temple-(center & left), and Cheops Pyramid-(right) Cheops Pyramid is a prominence of the cliff-former Supai (unit 2 of 4), the platform of Manakacha Formation

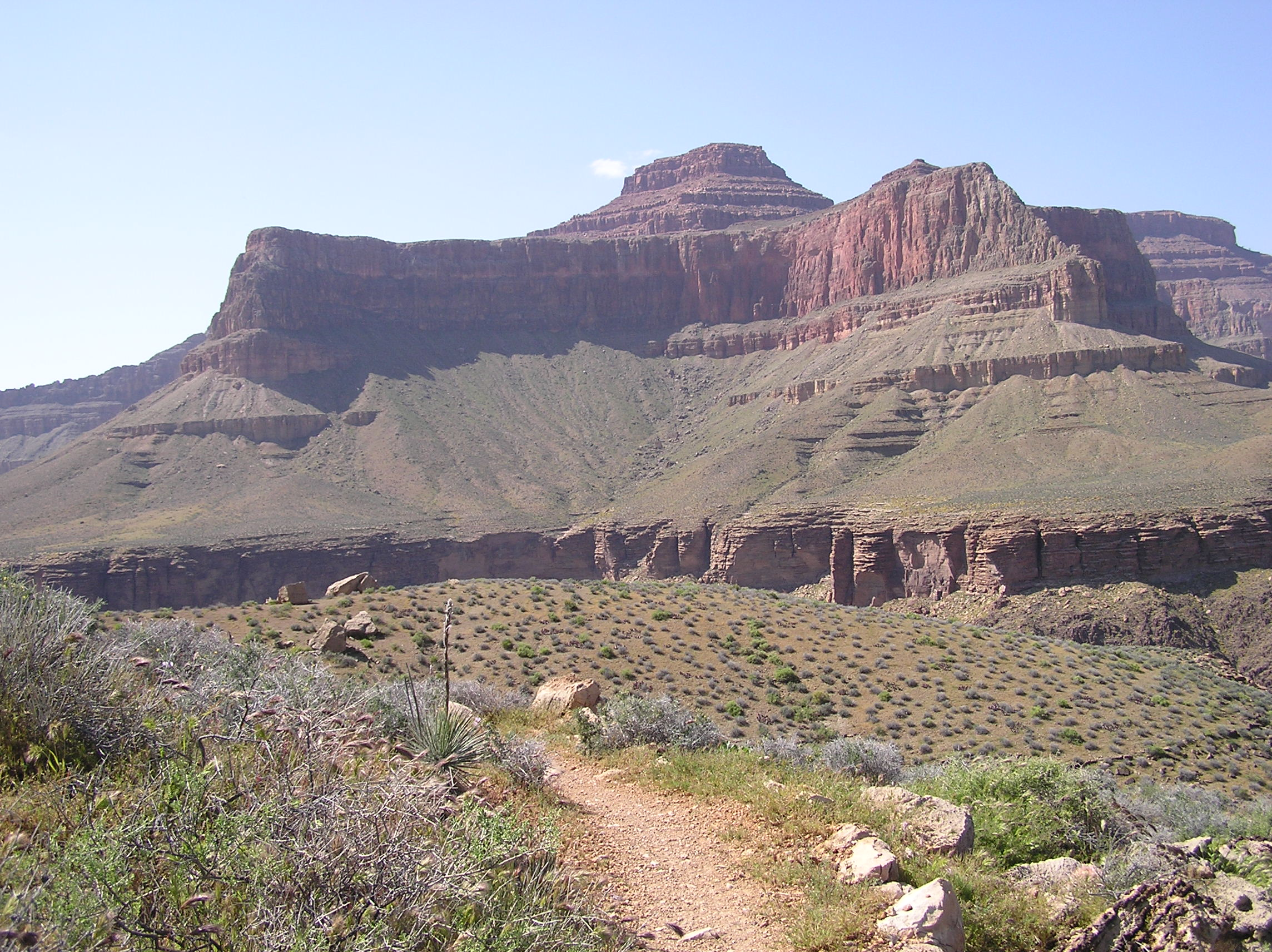
Tower of Set from Tonto Trail, across Granite Gorge

Plateau Point, a point on a platform of a cliff-formed rock unit, is common of the platforms created in the Grand Canyon. One notable, and highly visible example, are the points created by the upper platforms of the Redwall Limestone. Across the Colorado River and just downstream from Plateau Point, is the Tower of Set, with its beautiful points of Redwall Limestone cliffs and upper platforms.

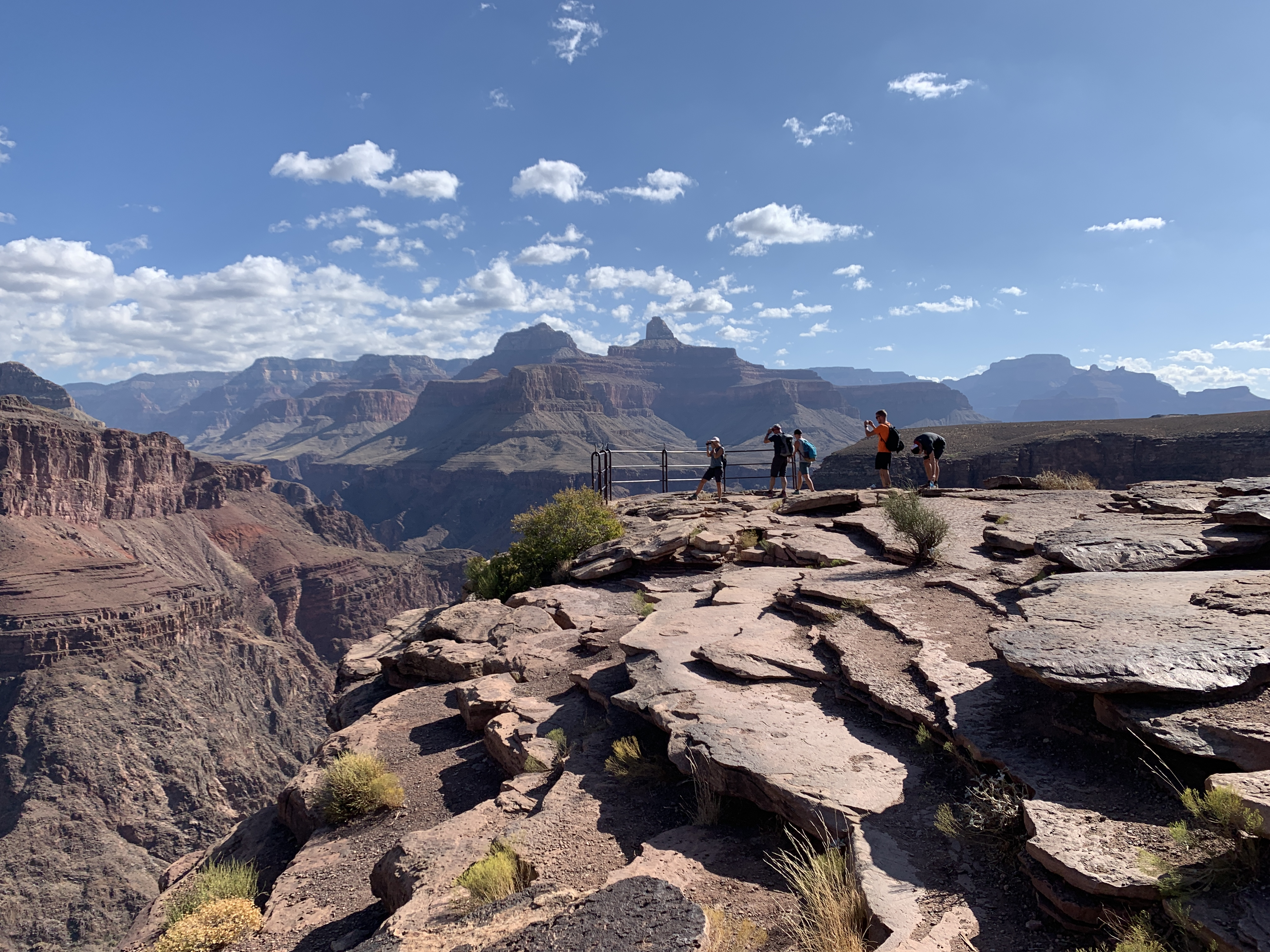
Tapeats Sandstone

Plateau Point sits on cliffs of Tapeats Sandstone, approximately 100 ft to 200 ft thick. The Tonto Trail traverses the platform of the Tapeats both to Tonto Trail (east), and to the extreme west, just beyond the Grand Scenic Divide, to Tonto Trail (west).

== Overlooking the Garden Creek & Pipe Creek Canyon outfall ==
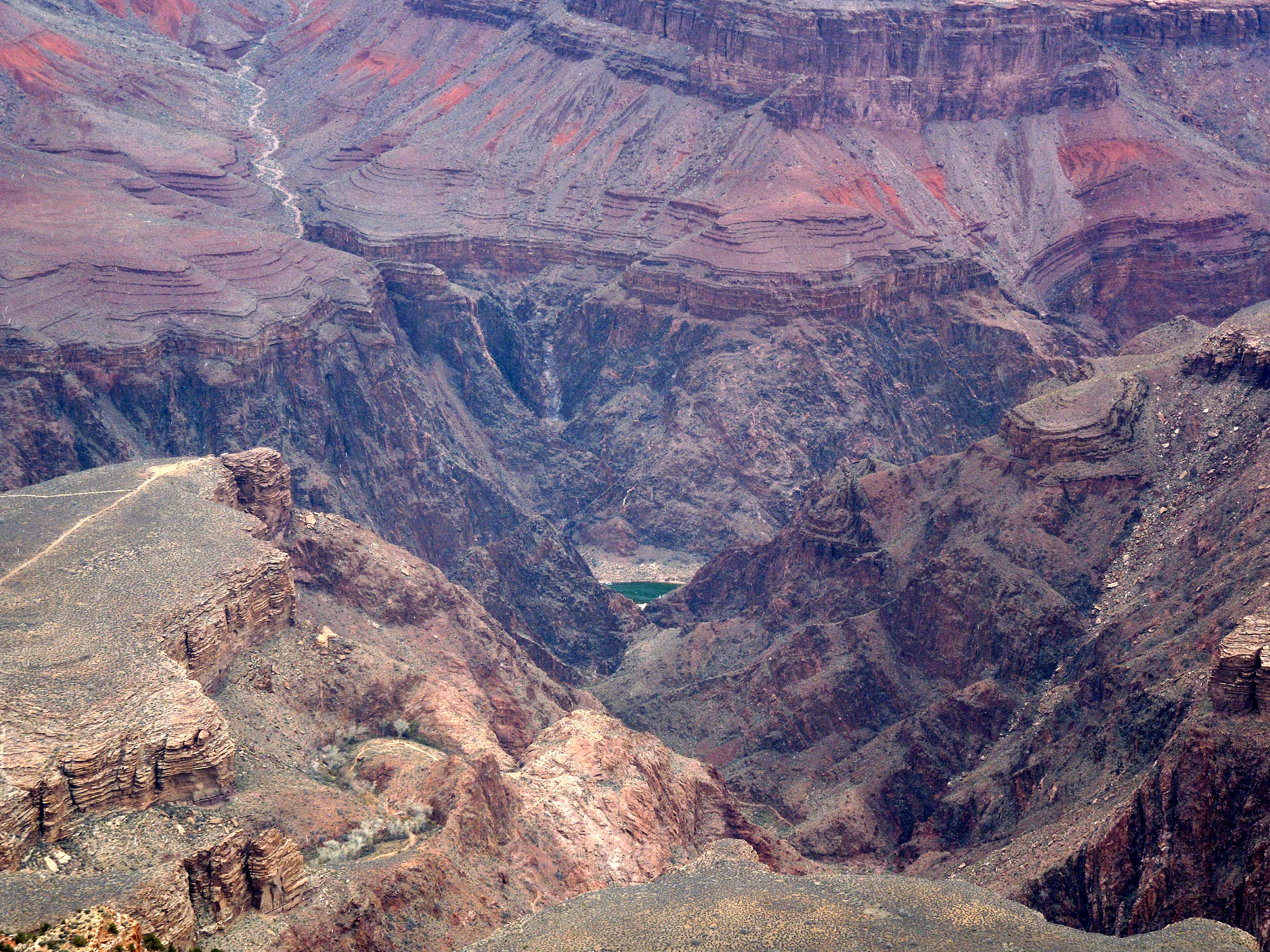
dramatic colors of paleoproterozoic rocks, and the outfall region of the Garden Creek Canyon & Pipe Creek Canyon intersection, (below Plateau Point)

Plateau Point overlooks the Lower Canyon's of the intersection of Garden Creek Canyon and intersecting Pipe Creek Canyon from the southeast. The Tonto Trail is forced to traverse south of this steep canyon region, and continue its traverse eastward towards the East Grand Canyon, as far as the Grand Canyon, East Rim, about 20 mi^{+} distance, by trail.

== See also ==
- Geology of the Grand Canyon area
- Plateau Point Trail
- The Battleship (Grand Canyon)
