= Plateau Point Trail =

Grand Canyon hiking trail

Coordinates: 36.08597°N 112.12378°W

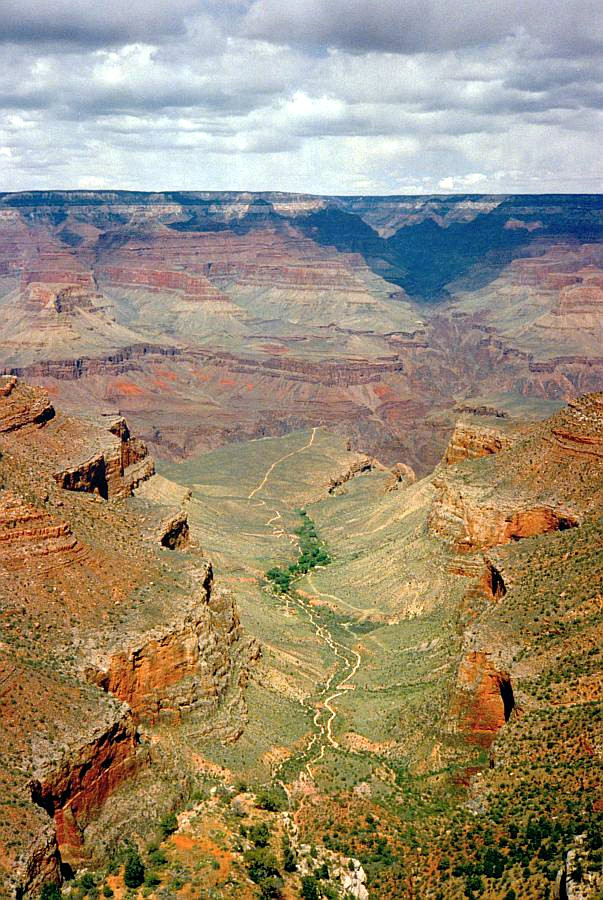
- 3-mi Plateau Point Trail west from Bright Angel Trail, down Garden Creek Canyon
- Location: Grand Canyon National Park, Arizona, United States
- Trailheads: Havasupai Gardens
- Use: Hiking
- Sights: Grand Canyon
- Hazards: Severe Weather; Overexertion; Dehydration; Flash Flood

The Plateau Point Trail is a hiking and pack trail located on the South Rim of the Grand Canyon National Park, located in the U.S. state of Arizona.

== Description ==
The trail is accessed by the Bright Angel Trail, at Havasupai Gardens.

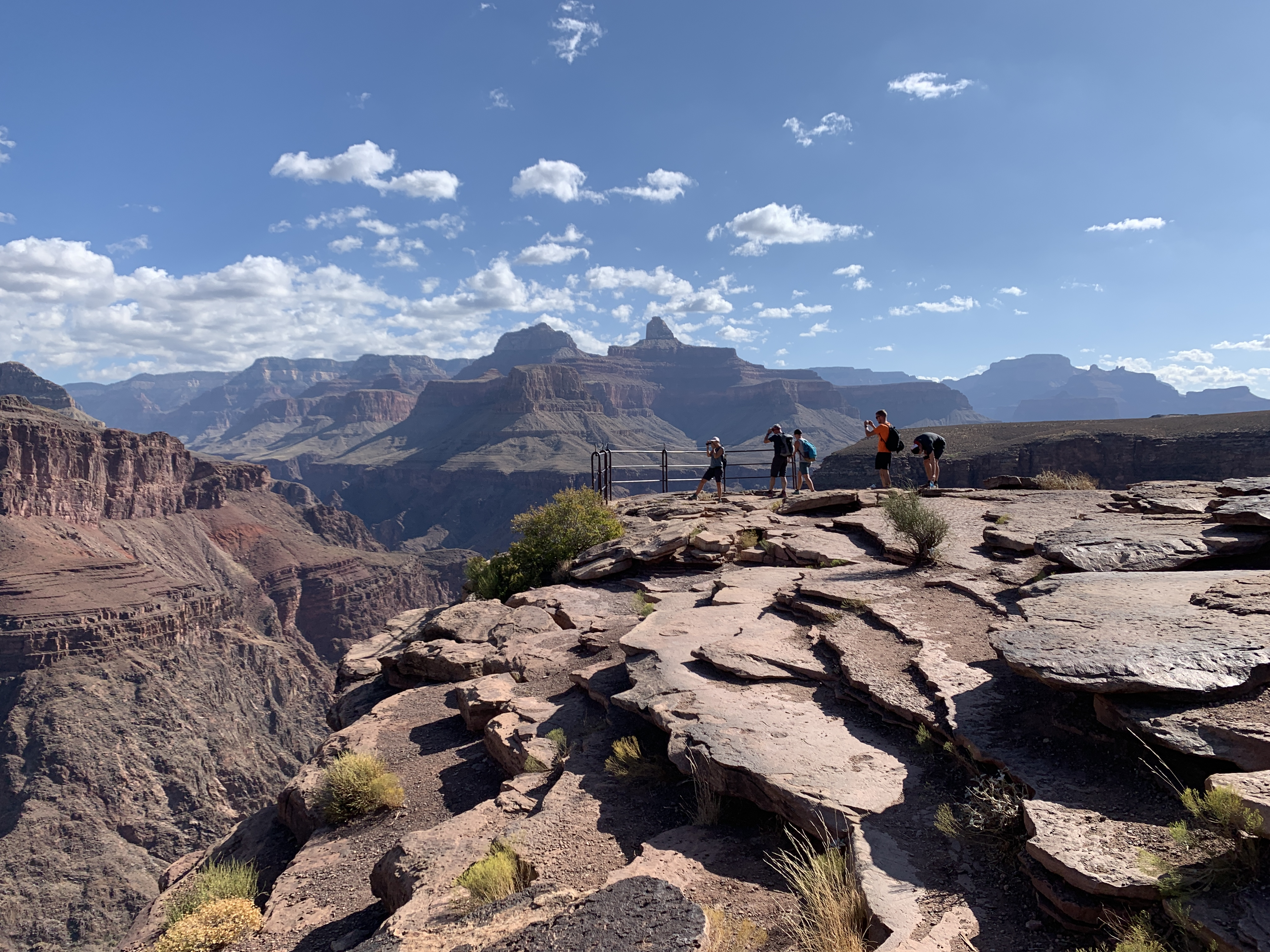
Plateau Point

The trail begins at Havasupai Gardens, 4.5 miles (7.2 km) from the rim on the Bright Angel Trail. The trail heads northeast from the day-use area at Havasupai Gardens and follows about 0.75 miles (1.2 km) of the Tonto Trail before it splits from the Tonto, turning north towards Plateau Point. 0.75 miles (1.2 km) from the junction the trail comes to an end at the point.

Plateau Point overlooks the Granite Gorge between Pipe Creek Canyon and Monument Canyon. It provides a view of the Colorado River from about 1,300 feet (400 m) above, while still 3,000 feet (900 m) below the south rim.

There is water available at Havasupai Gardens and near the end of the trail when turned on.

== See also ==
- The Grand Canyon
- List of trails in Grand Canyon National Park
