= Glass Mountain =

The Glass Mountain or Glass Mountain may refer to:

== Mountains in the United States ==
- Glass Mountain (California)
- Glass Mountain (Siskiyou County, California)
- Glass Mountain (Utah)
- Glass Mountains, a mountain range in Oklahoma, U.S.
- Glass Mountains, Texas, a mountain range in Brewster and Pecos Counties, Texas, U.S.

== Entertainment ==
- The Glass Mountain (fairy tale), a Polish fairy tale
- The Glass Mountain (short story), a short story by Donald Barthelme, inspired by the Polish fairy tale
- The Glass Mountain (1949 film), a British film with a famous theme by Nino Rota
- The Glass Mountain (1953 film), a Swedish film directed by Gustaf Molander
- "The Glass Mountain" (pulp), is the 6th pulp magazine story to feature The Avenger
- The Glass Mountain (novel), a 2002 novel by Jessica Rydill
- Glass Mountain, a 1991 novel by Cynthia Voigt
- Glass Mountain (album), by the rock band Roadstar
- Glass Mountain ("Glasberg" in the original German), a mythical location in the Brothers Grimm fairy tale "The Seven Ravens"
- Glass Mountain (magazine), the undergraduate literary magazine of the University of Houston
