= Jailhouse Rock =

Jailhouse Rock may refer to:

== Arts and entertainment ==
- Jailhouse Rock (film), a 1957 film starring Elvis Presley
  - "Jailhouse Rock" (song), a 1957 song recorded by Elvis Presley
  - Jailhouse Rock (EP), 1957, featuring songs from the film
- Jailhouse Rock, a 2004 musical play based on the film by Alan Janes

== Other uses ==
- Jailhouse Rock (Utah), a landform in Capitol Reef National Park, Utah
- Jailhouse rock (fighting style)
