= Sun temple (disambiguation) =

A sun temple is a building used for spiritual activities dedicated to the sun or a solar deity.

Sun Temple or Temple of the Sun may also refer to:

== Temples ==
- Sun Temple (Sogamoso), in Colombia
- Sun Temple, Modhera in Gujarat, India
- Konark Sun Temple, in Odisha, India
- Martand Sun Temple in Jammu and Kashmir, India
- Multan Sun Temple, in Punjab, Pakistan
- Temple of the Sun (Beijing) or Ritan, site of a Ming Dynasty altar, now a public park, in China
- Temple of the Sun (Rome), in ancient Rome
- Egyptian sun temple, ancient Egyptian temples to the sun god Ra, including:
  - Sun Temple of Userkaf

== Other uses ==
- Temple of the Sun (Utah), a summit in Capitol Reef National Park, Utah, US

== See also ==
- Solar deity
