= Jailhouse Rock (Utah) =

Summit located in Capitol Reef National Park, Utah

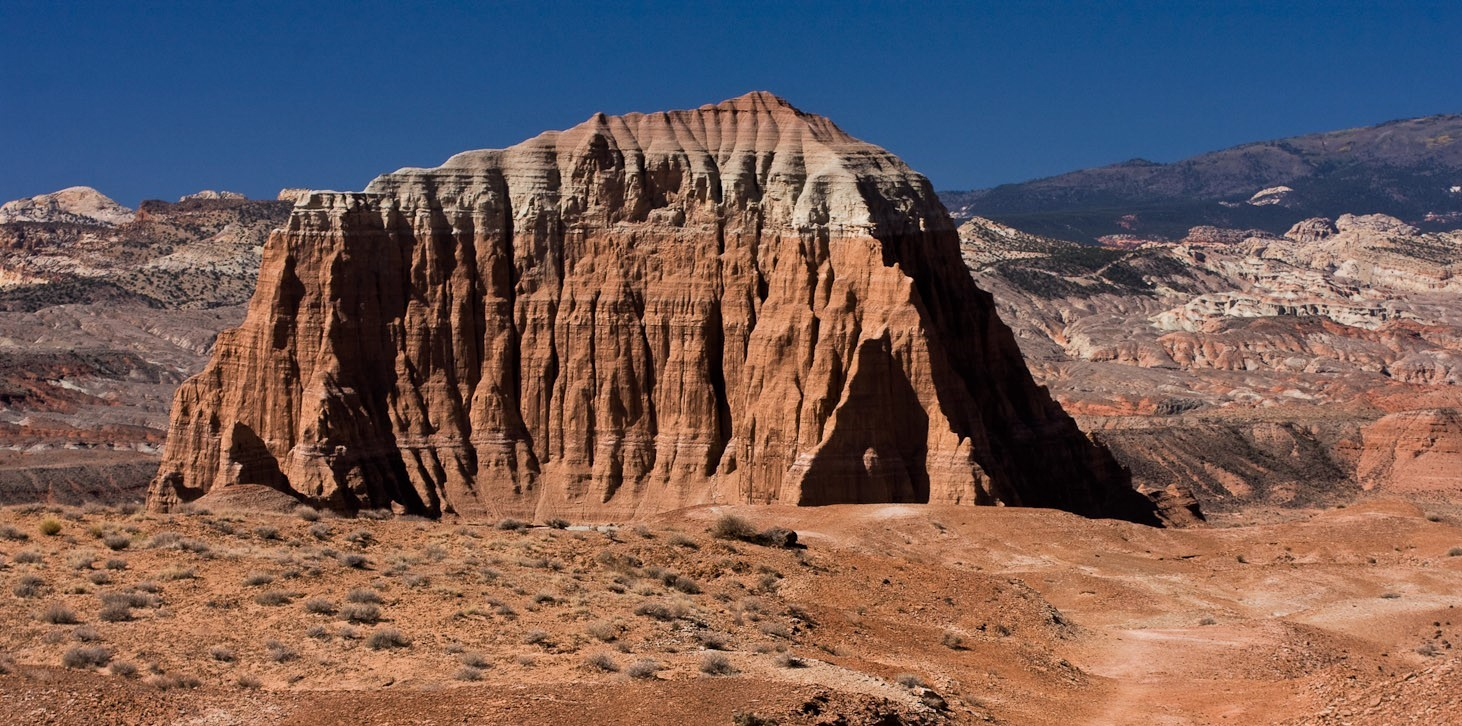
- Jailhouse Rock, northeast aspect

Highest point
- Elevation: 6,123 ft (1,866 m)
- Prominence: 503 ft (153 m)
- Parent peak: Point 6220
- Isolation: 0.60 mi (0.97 km)
- Coordinates: 38°24′07″N 111°13′10″W

Geography
- Location within Utah Location within the United States
- Country: United States
- State: Utah
- County: Wayne
- Protected area: Capitol Reef National Park
- Parent range: Colorado Plateau
- Topo map: USGS Fruita NW

Geology
- Rock age: Jurassic
- Rock type(s): Entrada Sandstone, Curtis Formation

Climbing
- Easiest route: class 5.x climbing

Jailhouse Rock is a 6,123-foot (1,866-meter) elevation summit located in Capitol Reef National Park, in Wayne County of Utah, United States. This remote iconic monolith is situated nine miles (14 km) north of the park's visitor center, and four miles (6.4 km) south of Temples of the Sun and Moon, in the South Desert of the park's North (Cathedral Valley) District. South Desert is a long, narrow valley that runs parallel to the strike of the Waterpocket Fold monocline. Cathedral Valley was so named in 1945 by Charles Kelly, first superintendent of Capitol Reef National Monument, because the valley's sandstone monoliths reminded early explorers of ornate, Gothic cathedrals, with fluted walls, alcoves, and pinnacles. Jailhouse Rock rises 500 feet (150 meters) above its surrounding terrain, and can be seen from the Lower South Desert Overlook, which is 15 miles northwest of Highway 24 via the Hartnet Road. The hiking approach to the base of this large promontory rising from the valley floor is made from the Lower South Desert Overlook via a switchback trail until it disappears along the valley floor. Precipitation runoff from this feature is drained by Deep Creek, a tributary of the Fremont River, which in turn is within the Colorado River drainage basin.

== Geology ==
Jailhouse Rock is composed of reddish Entrada Sandstone with a hard, grayish-green sandstone and siltstone Curtis Formation layer caprock which protects it from erosion. The sandstone, which was originally deposited as sandy mud on a tidal flat, is believed to have formed about 160 million years ago during the Jurassic period as a giant sand sea, the largest in Earth's history. Long after these sedimentary rocks were deposited, the Colorado Plateau was uplifted relatively evenly, keeping the layers roughly horizontal, but Capitol Reef is an exception because of the Waterpocket Fold, a classic monocline, which formed between 50 and 70 million years ago during the Laramide Orogeny.

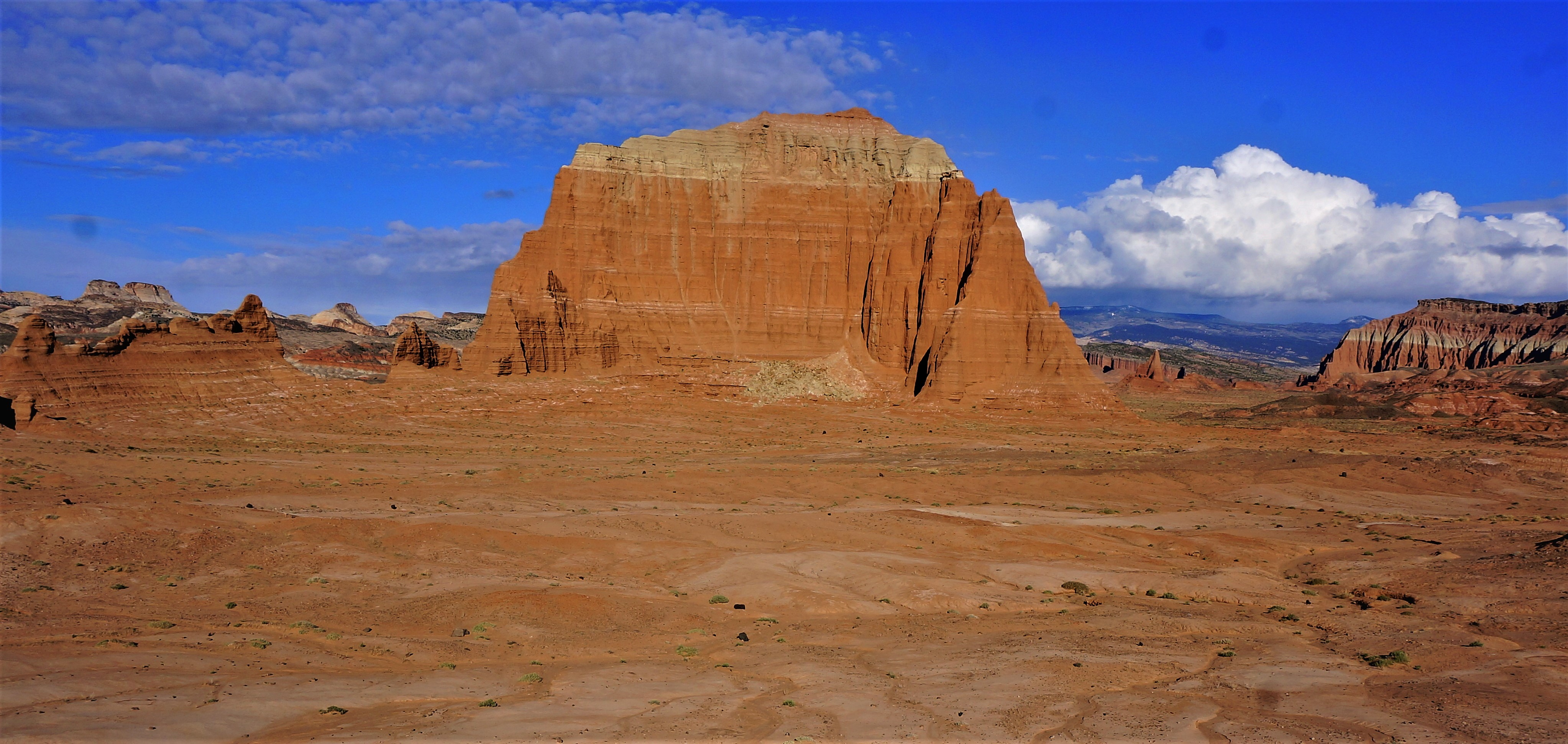
Jailhouse Rock from the northeast

== Climate ==
Spring and fall are the most favorable seasons to visit Jailhouse Rock. According to the Köppen climate classification system, it is located in a Cold semi-arid climate zone, which is defined by the coldest month having an average mean temperature below 32 °F (0 °C), and at least 50% of the total annual precipitation being received during the spring and summer. This desert climate receives less than 10 inches (250 millimeters) of annual rainfall, and snowfall is generally light during the winter.

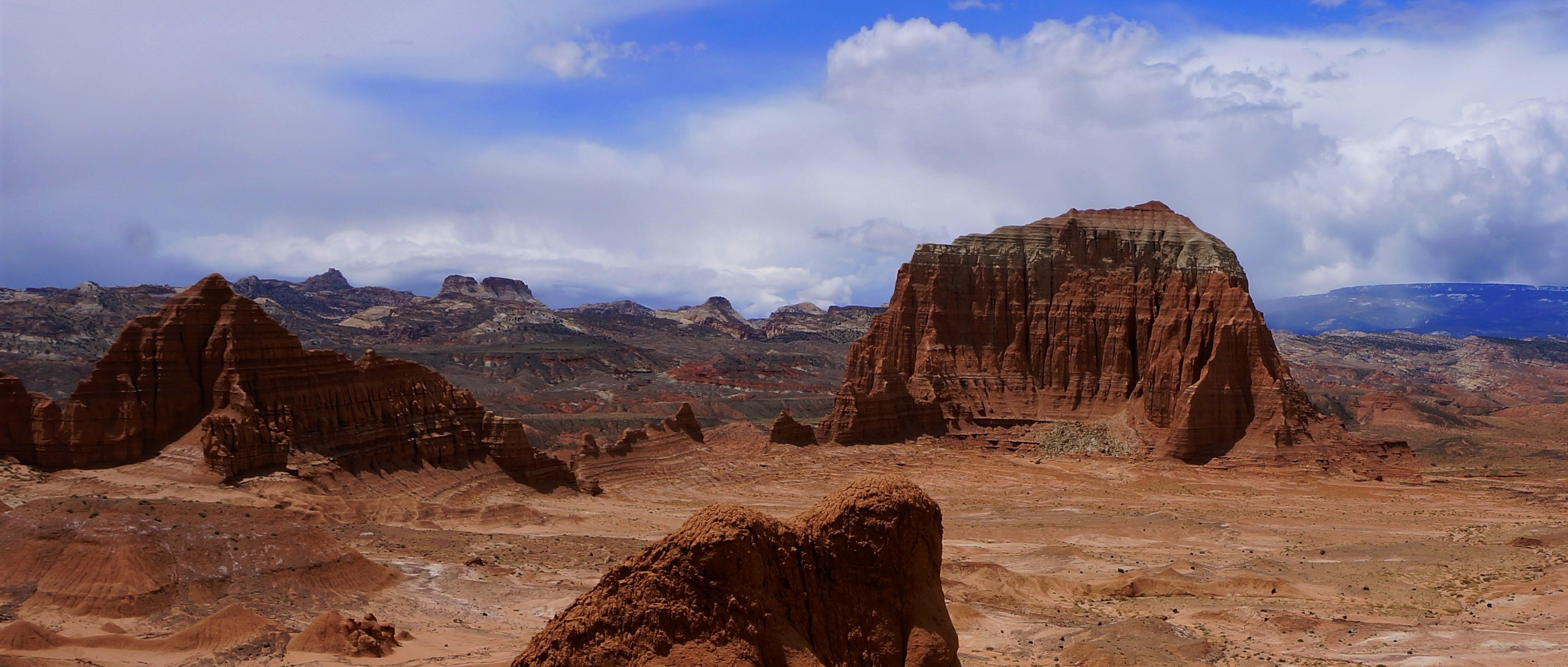
Jailhouse Rock

== See also ==
- Colorado Plateau
- Geology of the Capitol Reef area
