= Temple of the Moon (Utah) =

Summit in the American state of Utah

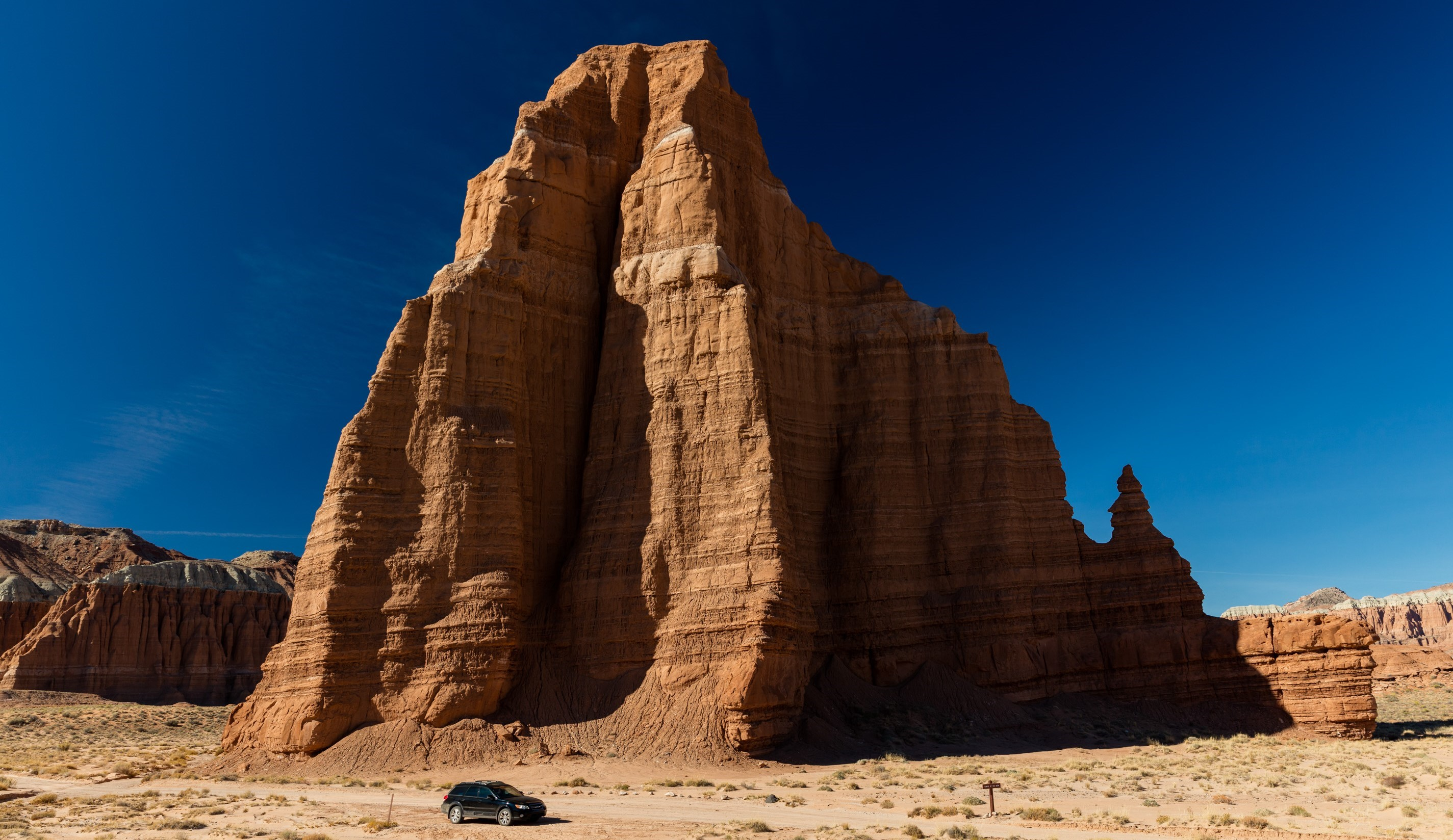
- Temple of the Moon, east aspect

Highest point
- Elevation: 5,665 ft (1,727 m)
- Prominence: 285 ft (87 m)
- Parent peak: Temple of the Sun (5,822 ft)
- Isolation: 0.37 mi (0.60 km)
- Coordinates: 38°26′46″N 111°11′30″W

Geography
- Location within Utah Location within the United States
- Country: United States
- State: Utah
- County: Wayne
- Protected area: Capitol Reef National Park
- Parent range: Colorado Plateau
- Topo map: USGS Fruita NW

Geology
- Rock age: Jurassic
- Rock type: Entrada Sandstone

Climbing
- Easiest route: closed to climbing

Temple of the Moon is a 5,665-foot (1,727-meter) elevation summit located in Capitol Reef National Park, in Wayne County of Utah, United States. This remote, iconic monolith is situated 12 mi (19 km) north-northeast of the park's visitor center, and 0.37 mi (0.60 km) south of Temple of the Sun, in the Middle Desert of the park's North (Cathedral Valley) District. Cathedral Valley was so named in 1945 by Charles Kelly, first superintendent of Capitol Reef National Monument, because the valley's sandstone monoliths reminded early explorers of ornate, Gothic cathedrals, with fluted walls, alcoves, and pinnacles. The free-standing Temple of the Moon towers nearly 300 feet (91 meters) above its surrounding terrain, which is within the Fremont River drainage basin. John C. Frémont's 1853 expedition passed through Cathedral Valley.

== Geology ==
Temple of the Moon is composed of unfractured, buff-pink Entrada Sandstone. The sandstone, which was originally deposited as sandy mud on a tidal flat, is believed to have formed about 160 million years ago during the Jurassic period as a giant sand sea, the largest in Earth's history. Stratum in Cathedral Valley have a gentle inclination of three to five degrees to the east, and appear nearly horizontal. Long after these sedimentary rocks were deposited, the Colorado Plateau was uplifted relatively evenly, keeping the layers roughly horizontal, but Capitol Reef is an exception because of the Waterpocket Fold, a classic monocline, which formed between 50 and 70 million years ago during the Laramide Orogeny.

== Gallery ==
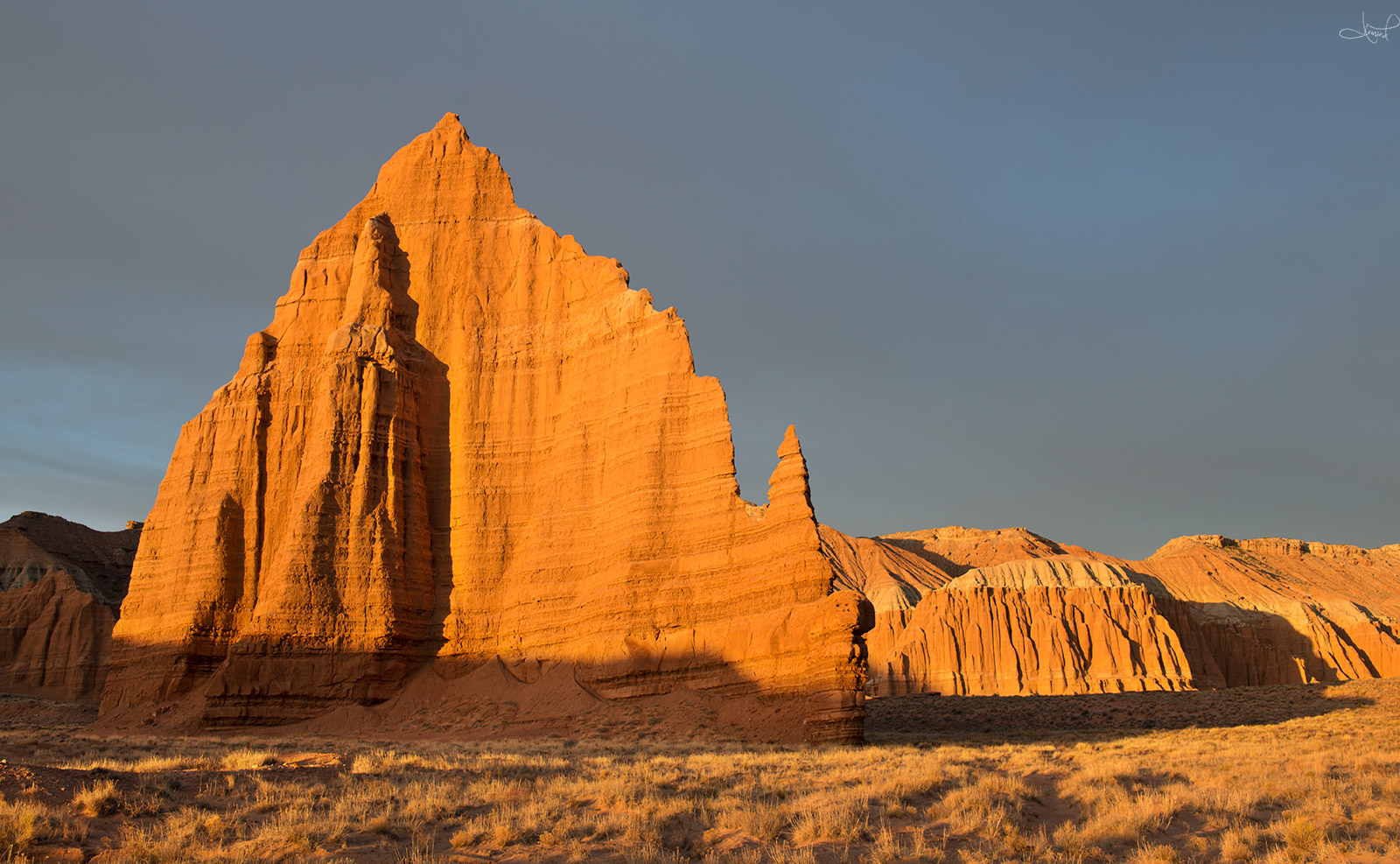
Sunrise on Temple of the Moon

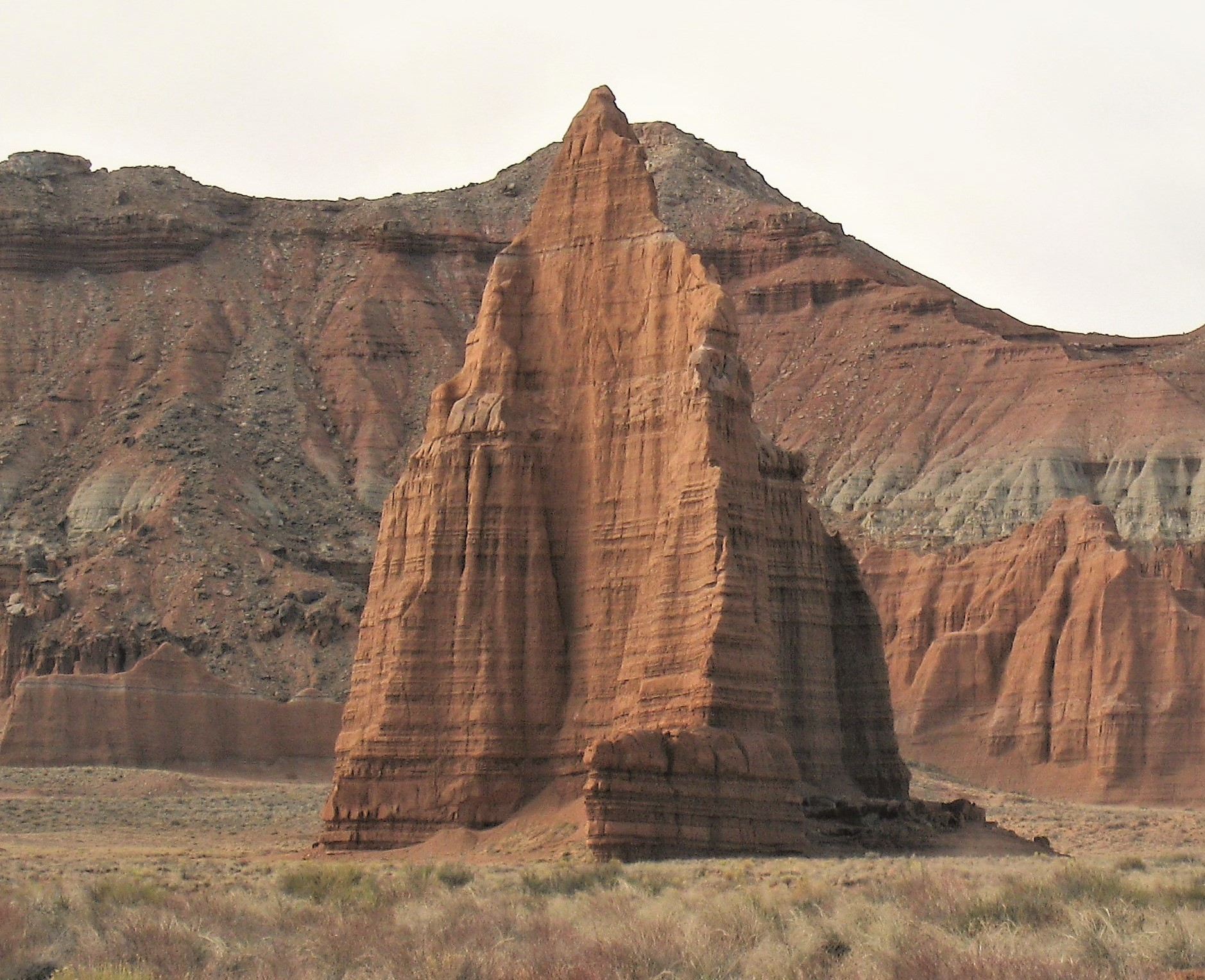
North aspect

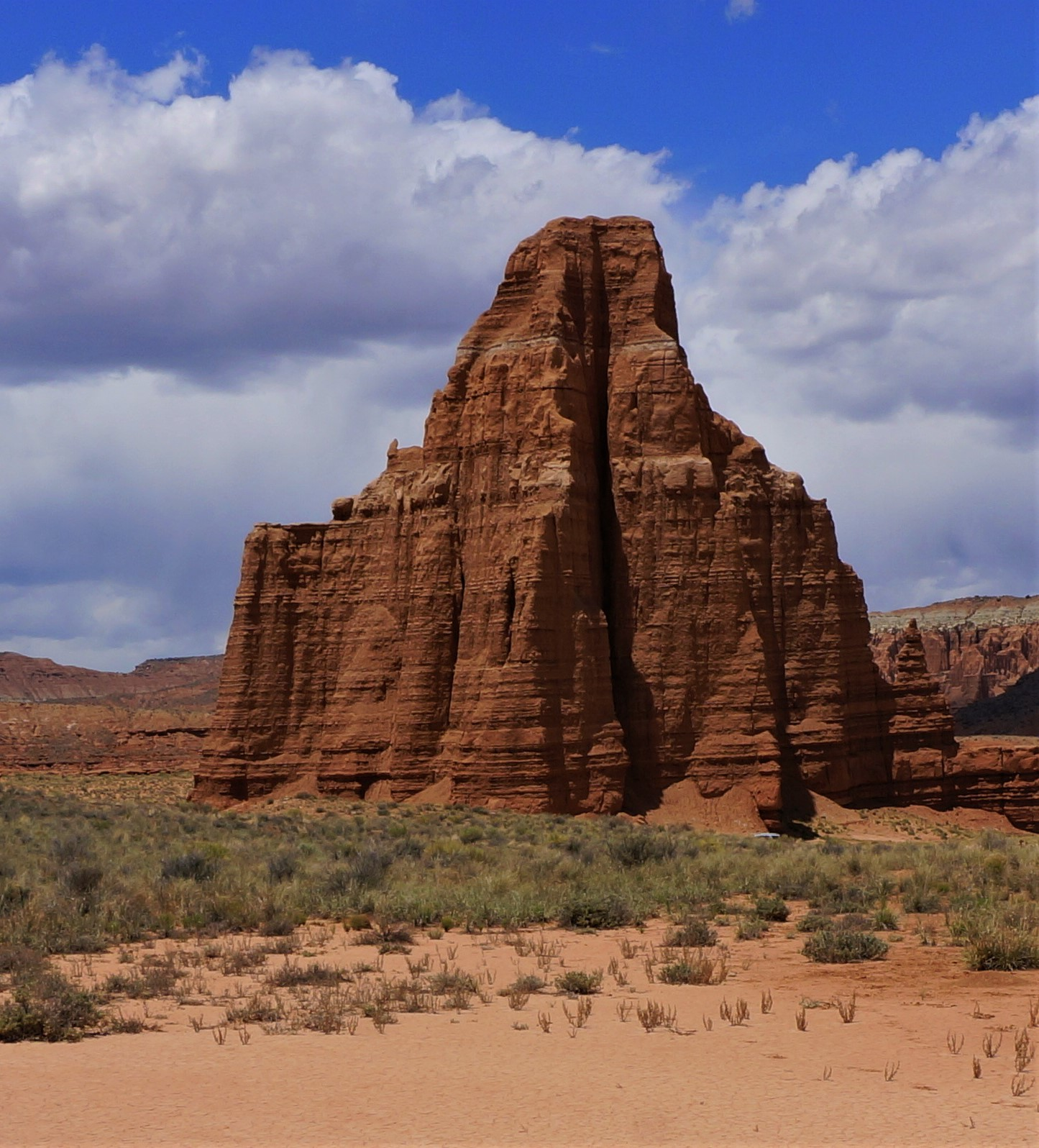
Southeast aspect

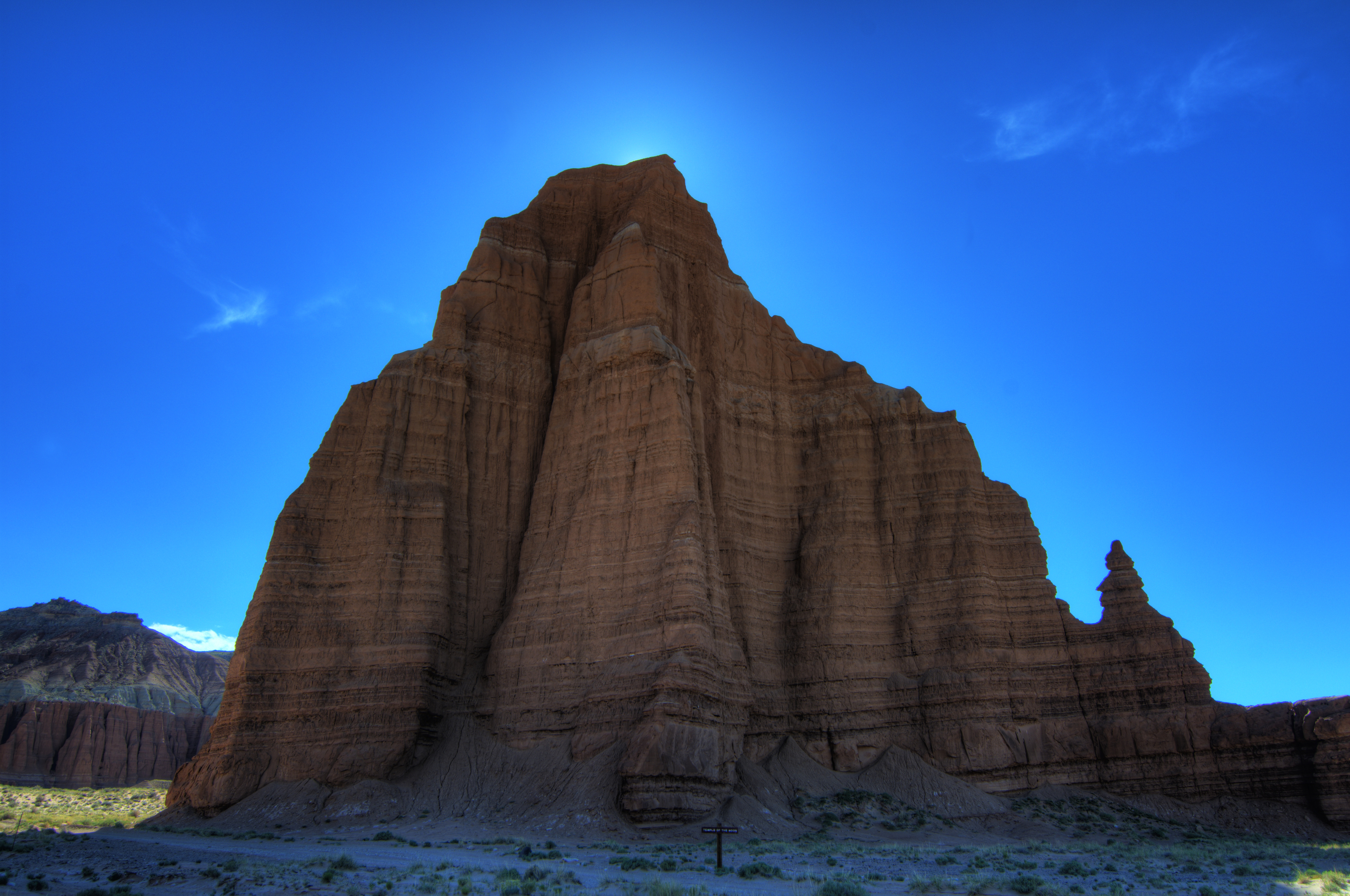

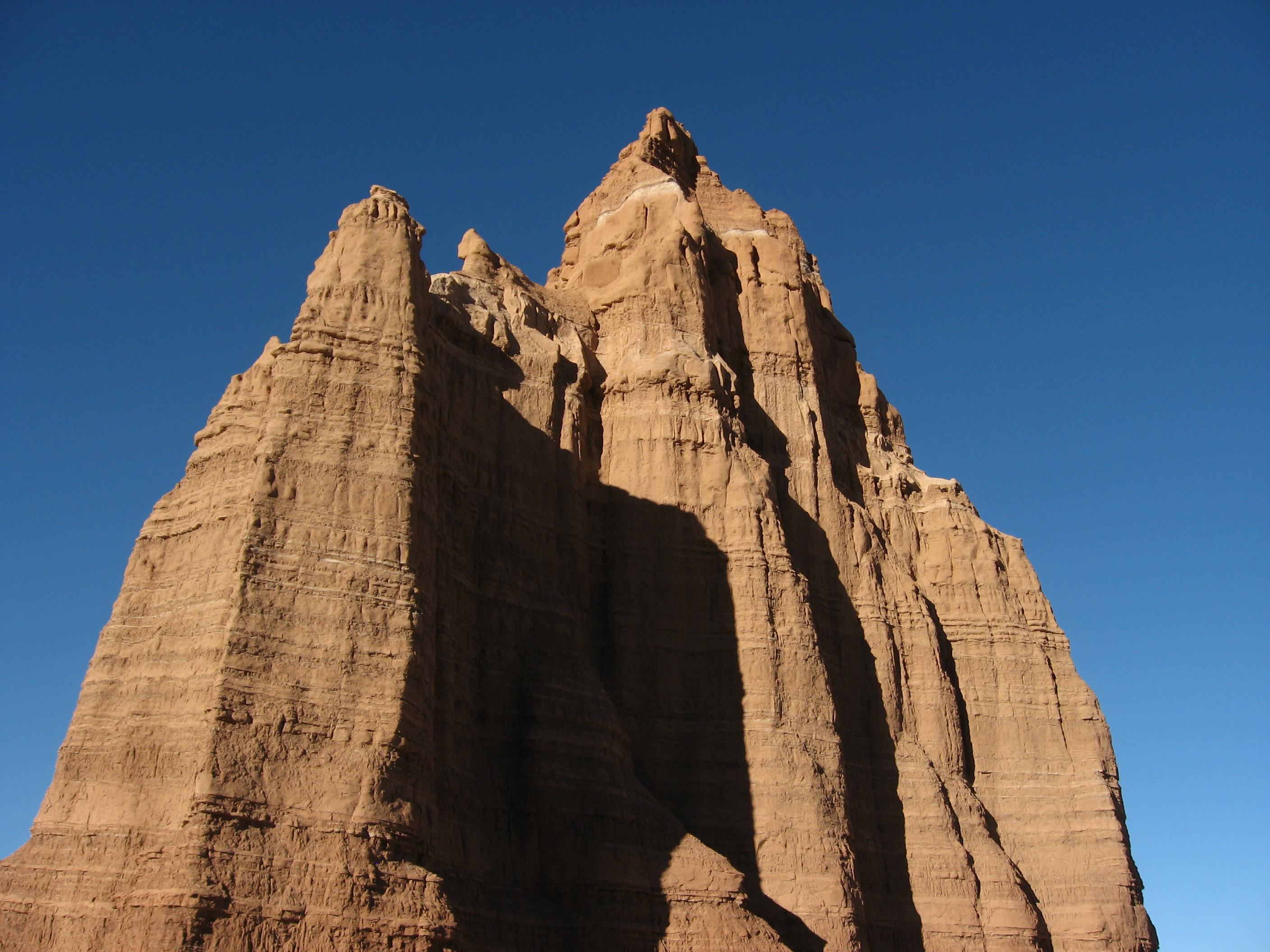

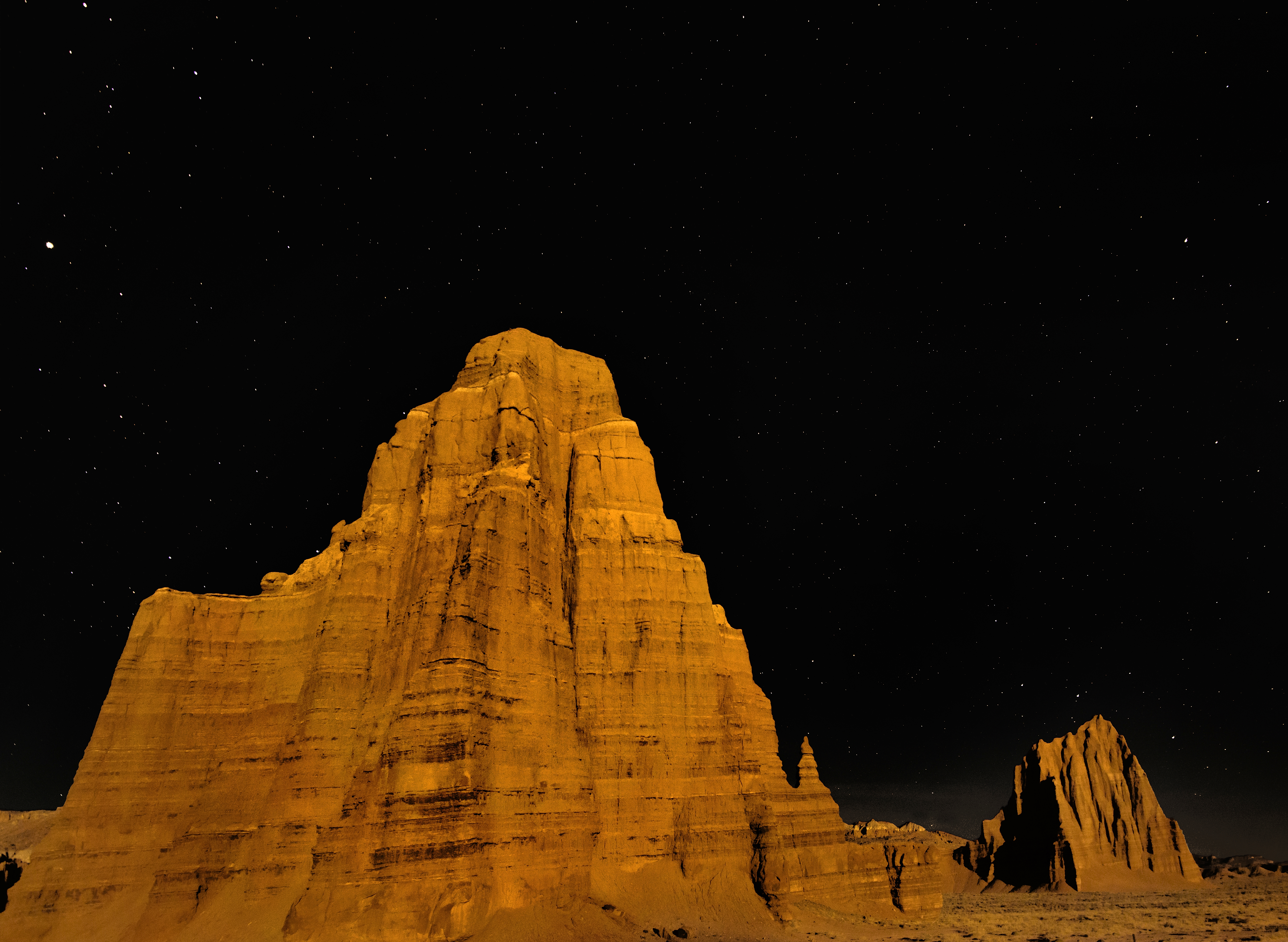
Temple of the Moon (left) illuminated by moonlight.
Looking north-northwest, with Temple of the Sun to the right.

== Climate ==
Spring and fall are the most favorable seasons to visit Temple of the Moon. According to the Köppen climate classification system, it is located in a Cold semi-arid climate zone, which is defined by the coldest month having an average mean temperature below 32 °F (0 °C), and at least 50% of the total annual precipitation being received during the spring and summer. This desert climate receives less than 10 inches (250 millimeters) of annual rainfall, and snowfall is generally light during the winter.

Climate data for Capitol Reef Visitor Center, elevation 5,653 ft (1,723 m), 1981-2010 normals, extremes 1981-2019
Month	Jan	Feb	Mar	Apr	May	Jun	Jul	Aug	Sep	Oct	Nov	Dec	Year
Record high °F (°C)	58.6 (14.8)	68.3 (20.2)	78.3 (25.7)	84.4 (29.1)	94.6 (34.8)	100.2 (37.9)	100.8 (38.2)	97.9 (36.6)	95.4 (35.2)	86.1 (30.1)	70.4 (21.3)	61.5 (16.4)	100.8 (38.2)
Mean daily maximum °F (°C)	40.6 (4.8)	46.4 (8.0)	54.7 (12.6)	65.0 (18.3)	74.5 (23.6)	85.3 (29.6)	90.4 (32.4)	87.9 (31.1)	80.2 (26.8)	66.1 (18.9)	51.3 (10.7)	40.6 (4.8)	65.3 (18.5)
Mean daily minimum °F (°C)	17.8 (−7.9)	22.7 (−5.2)	30.2 (−1.0)	36.2 (2.3)	44.7 (7.1)	53.1 (11.7)	60.4 (15.8)	58.5 (14.7)	50.4 (10.2)	39.0 (3.9)	27.6 (−2.4)	18.2 (−7.7)	38.3 (3.5)
Record low °F (°C)	−4.2 (−20.1)	−11.8 (−24.3)	9.1 (−12.7)	18.1 (−7.7)	27.2 (−2.7)	34.6 (1.4)	42.4 (5.8)	45.1 (7.3)	29.9 (−1.2)	11.7 (−11.3)	8.0 (−13.3)	−7.5 (−21.9)	−11.8 (−24.3)
Average precipitation inches (mm)	0.52 (13)	0.34 (8.6)	0.53 (13)	0.47 (12)	0.59 (15)	0.47 (12)	0.91 (23)	1.20 (30)	0.80 (20)	0.98 (25)	0.49 (12)	0.32 (8.1)	7.62 (194)
Average dew point °F (°C)	17.3 (−8.2)	20.8 (−6.2)	23.0 (−5.0)	24.5 (−4.2)	29.1 (−1.6)	32.0 (0.0)	40.0 (4.4)	41.8 (5.4)	34.8 (1.6)	28.2 (−2.1)	21.9 (−5.6)	17.5 (−8.1)	27.6 (−2.4)
Source: PRISM

== See also ==
- Geology of the Capitol Reef area
