= Jessica Rydill =

English writer

Jessica Rydill is a British fantasy author from the West Country. She was born in 1959. She studied at King's College, Cambridge and the College of Law, working as a solicitor for 13 years. Her travels in Israel, France, Eastern Europe and Southern Africa have provided some of the inspiration for her writing. She was a founder member of the Write Fantastic writers' group together with Fantasy authors Sarah Ash, Chaz Brenchley, Mark Chadbourn, Juliet E. McKenna, the late Deborah J. Miller, Stan Nicholls, Kari Sperring, Freda Warrington and Ian Whates.

Her interests include collecting Asian ball-jointed dolls, Richard III, Sasha dolls, myth, and East European music. Her short story My Brother Jonathan was short-listed for the Ian St James award in 1999 and she appears in The New Writer magazine Roll of Honour.

Her first novel, Children of the Shaman, was published by Orbit in 2001, and was short-listed for the Locus magazine best first novel in 2002. A sequel, The Glass Mountain, appeared in October 2002. A short story, The Anniversary, was published in an anthology printed by NewCon Press in 2010 to celebrate the fifth anniversary of The Write Fantastic.

Both books have been reissued by small press Kristell Ink Publishing, together with sequels Malarat and Winterbloom. They have cover art by artist Daniele Serra and Children of the Shaman also has internal illustrations by Evelinn Enoksen, who designed the maps. After publication of Children of the Shaman, the three remaining books were released through Amazon in February 2019 and are available from many booksellers.

Rydill's first three books are set in the alternate world of Mir, with elements of Slavic Fantasy, but Winterbloom is the first in which part of the action takes place in the real world, in her home-town, the city of Bath, and features a number of historical figures from Dr John Dee to Aleister Crowley.

Her sister Sarah Ash, author of the Tears of Artamon trilogy, the Tide Dragons series and many other works, is also a fantasy novelist.
