= Bell Butte =

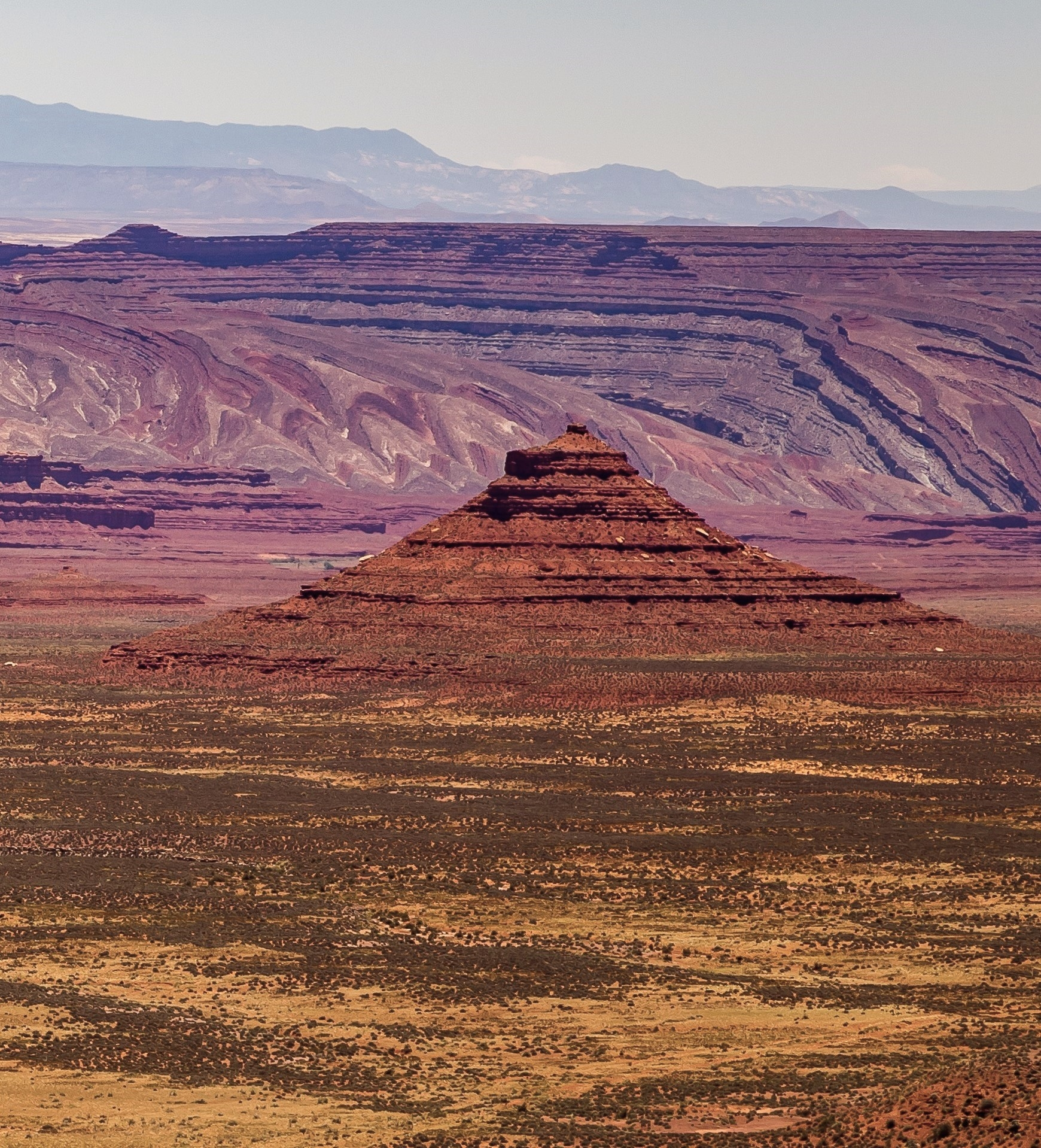
- Northwest aspect, viewed from Moki Dugway

Highest point
- Elevation: 5,351 ft (1,631 m)
- Prominence: 291 ft (89 m)
- Parent peak: Lady in the Bathtub
- Isolation: 2.97 mi (4.78 km)
- Coordinates: 37°14′27″N 109°53′46″W

Geography
- Location within Utah Location within the United States
- Location: Valley of the Gods; San Juan County, Utah, U.S.
- Parent range: Colorado Plateau
- Topo map: USGS The Goosenecks

Geology
- Rock age: Permian
- Rock type(s): Sandstone, siltstone

Climbing
- Easiest route: class 2+ scrambling

Bell Butte is a 5,351-foot-elevation (1,631-meter) pillar in San Juan County, Utah, United States.

== Description ==
Bell Butte is situated 19 miles (31 km) west of Bluff, Utah, in the Valley of the Gods, on land administered by the Bureau of Land Management. Precipitation runoff from this landform drains to the San Juan River via Lime Creek. Access to the butte is from Highway 261. Topographic relief is significant as the summit rises 450 feet (137 meters) above the valley floor in 0.2 mile (0.32 km). This landform's descriptive toponym has been officially adopted by the United States Board on Geographic Names.

== Geology ==
Bell Butte is composed of strata of early Permian Halgaito Formation which is the basal member of the Cutler Group. The valley floor is Honaker Trail Formation.

== Climate ==
Spring and fall are the most favorable seasons to visit Bell Butte. According to the Köppen climate classification system, it is located in a cold semi-arid climate zone with cold winters and hot summers. Summers highs rarely exceed 100 °F (38 °C). Summer nights are comfortably cool, and temperatures drop quickly after sunset. Winters are cold, but daytime highs are usually above freezing. Winter temperatures below 0 °F (−18 °C) are uncommon, though possible. This desert climate receives less than 10 inches (250 millimeters) of annual rainfall, and snowfall is generally light during the winter.

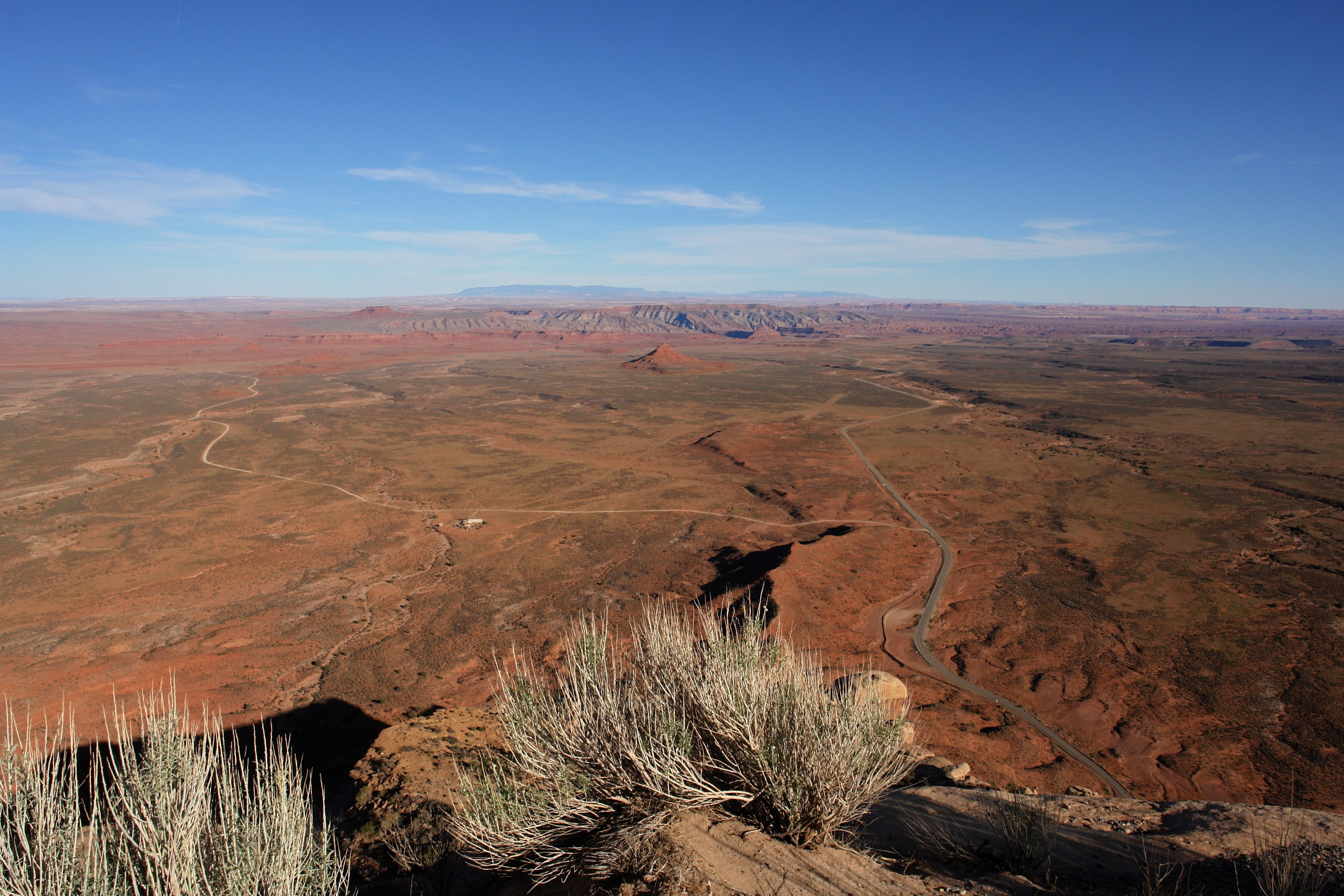
View from Cedar Mesa. Valley of the Gods Road to left, State Route 261 to right, with Bell Butte centered between.
