= Valley of the Gods =

Sandstone basin in Utah, United States

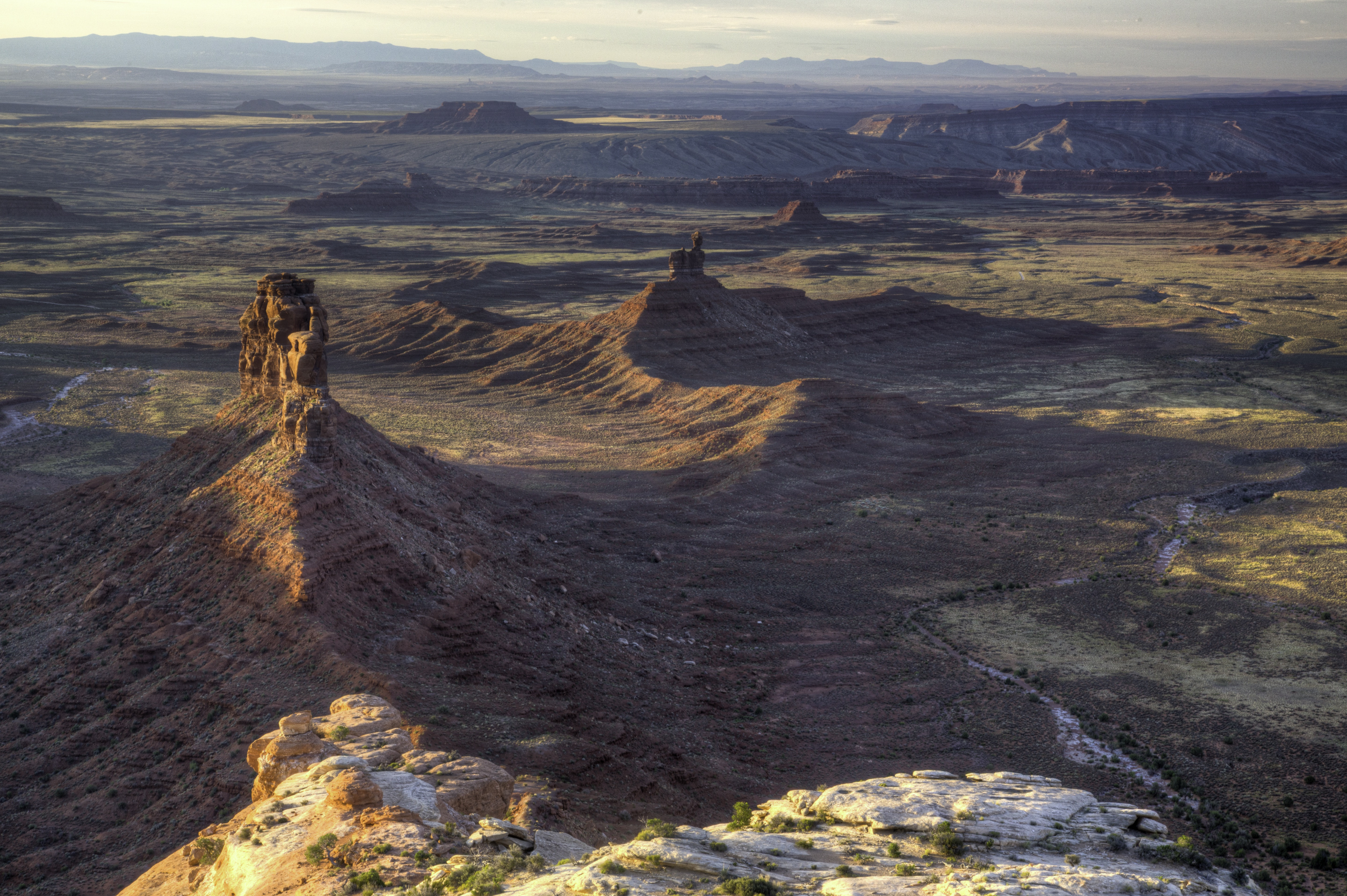
- Valley of the Gods

- Location within Utah Location within the United States
- Floor elevation: 4,300 ft (1,300 m)
- Length: 8.1 mi (13.0 km)
- Width: 8.7 mi (14.0 km)
- Area: 152 sq mi (390 km^{2})
- Depth: 1,800 ft (550 m)

Geography
- Location: San Juan County, Utah; United States
- Coordinates: 37°14′11″N 109°48′49″W
- Interactive map of Valley of the Gods

The Valley of the Gods is a scenic sandstone valley near Mexican Hat in San Juan County, southeastern Utah, United States. Part of Bears Ears National Monument, the Valley of the Gods is located north of Monument Valley across the San Juan River and has rock formations similar to those in Monument Valley with tall, reddish brown mesas, buttes, towers and mushroom rocks, remnants of an ancient landscape. On December 4, 2017, President Donald Trump issued a proclamation that reduced the area of Bears Ears National Monument, proclaimed by President Barack Obama on December 28, 2016, with new monument boundaries that exclude the Valley of the Gods. The area remains protected public land administered as an Area of Critical Environmental Concern and managed by the Bureau of Land Management, as it was before the monument designation.

== Overview ==
The Valley of the Gods may be toured via a 17-mile (27 km) gravel road (San Juan County Road 242) that winds around the formations. The road is rather steep and bumpy in parts but is passable by non-four-wheel drive vehicles in dry weather. The western end joins Utah State Route 261 shortly before its 1,200-foot (370 m) ascent up Cedar Mesa at Moki Dugway, while the eastern end starts nine miles (14 km) from the town of Mexican Hat along U.S. Route 163 and heads north, initially crossing flat, open land and following the course of Lime Creek, a seasonal wash, before turning west toward the buttes and pinnacles. Officially named buttes seen from the road include Seven Sailors, Setting Hen Butte, Rooster Butte, Franklin Butte, Battleship Rock, Castle Butte, De Gaulle and His Troops, Lady in the Bathtub, and Bell Butte. In addition to the gravel road, the area is also crisscrossed by off-road dirt trails.

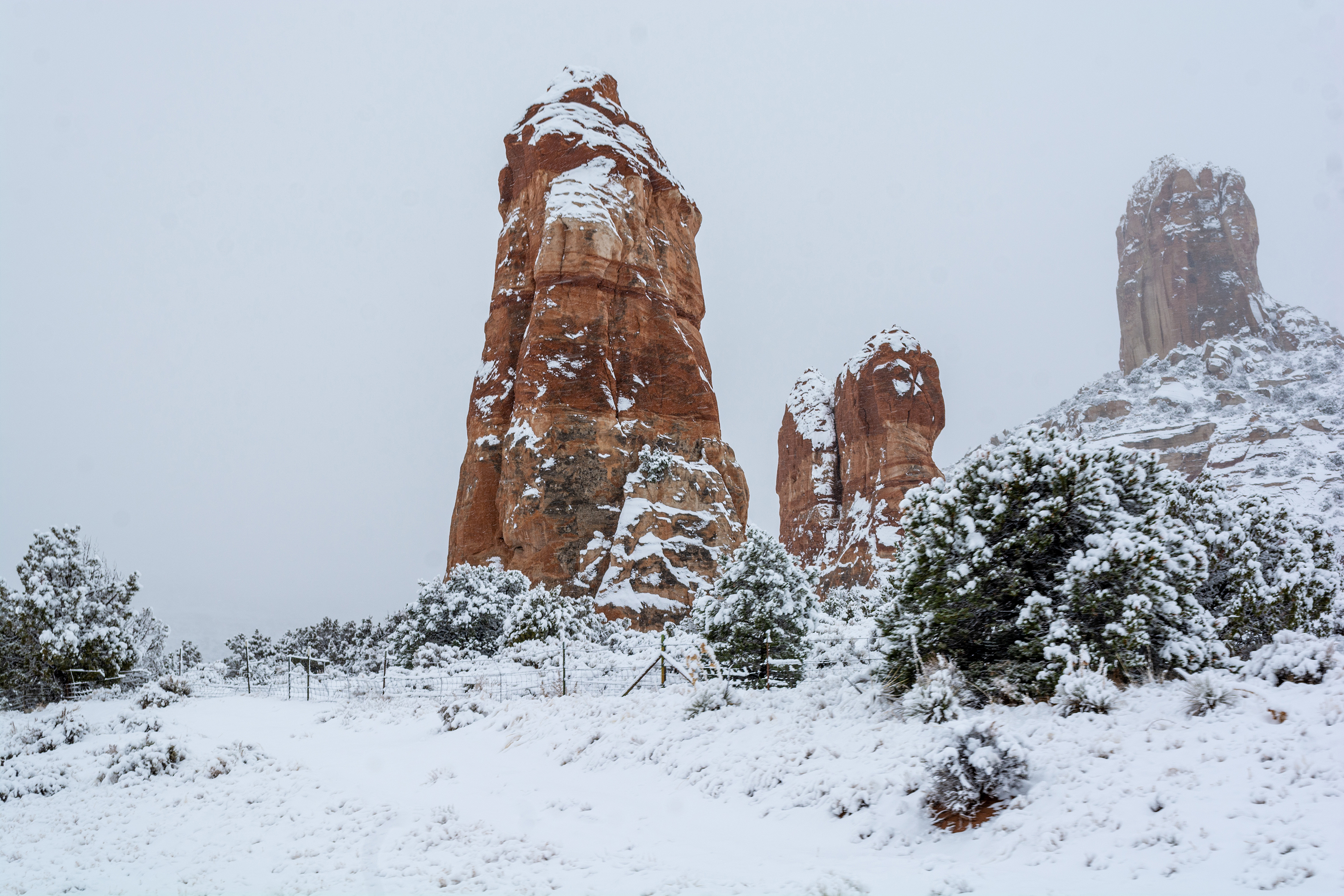
Valley of the Gods in the snow in November 2019

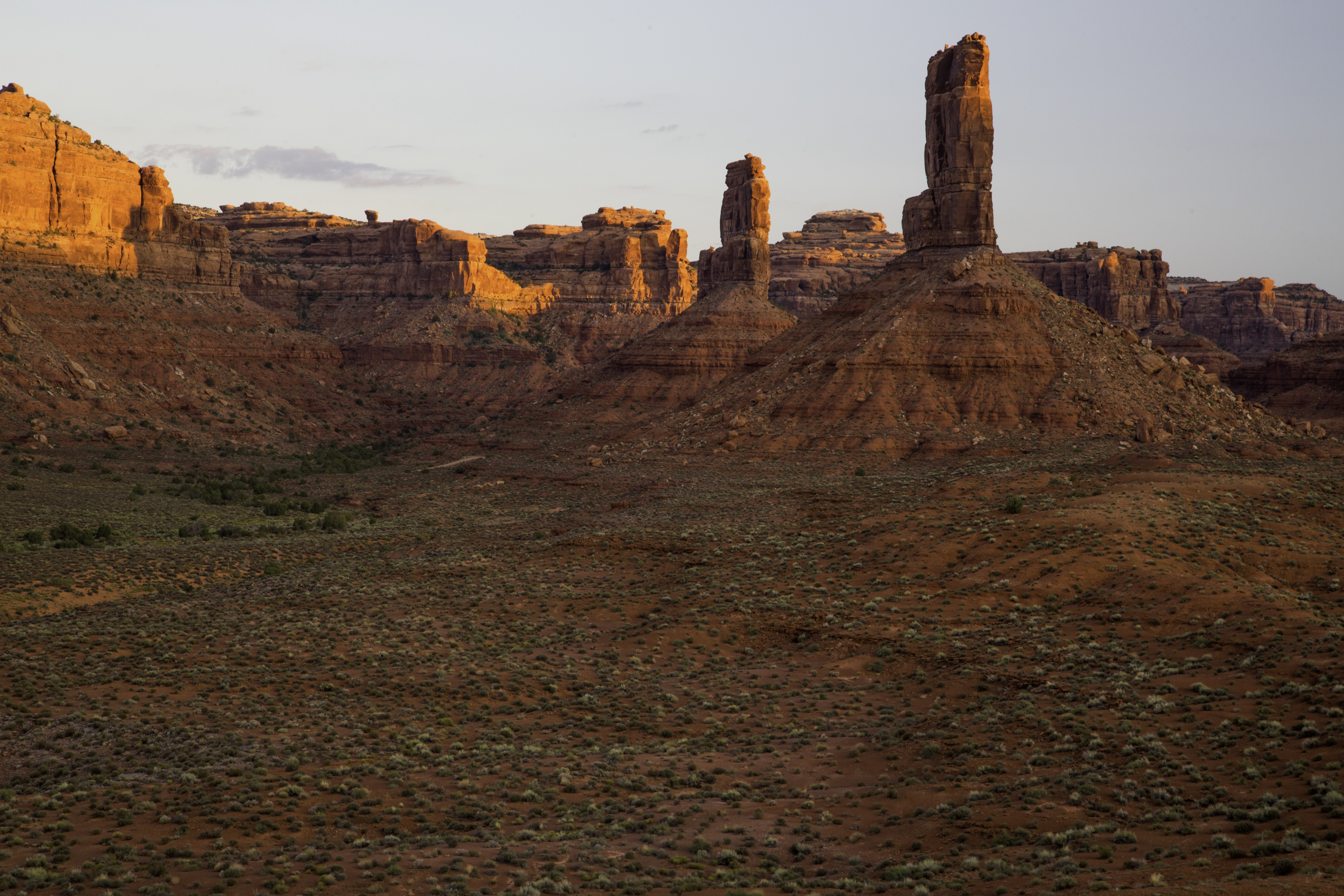
Sandstone towers

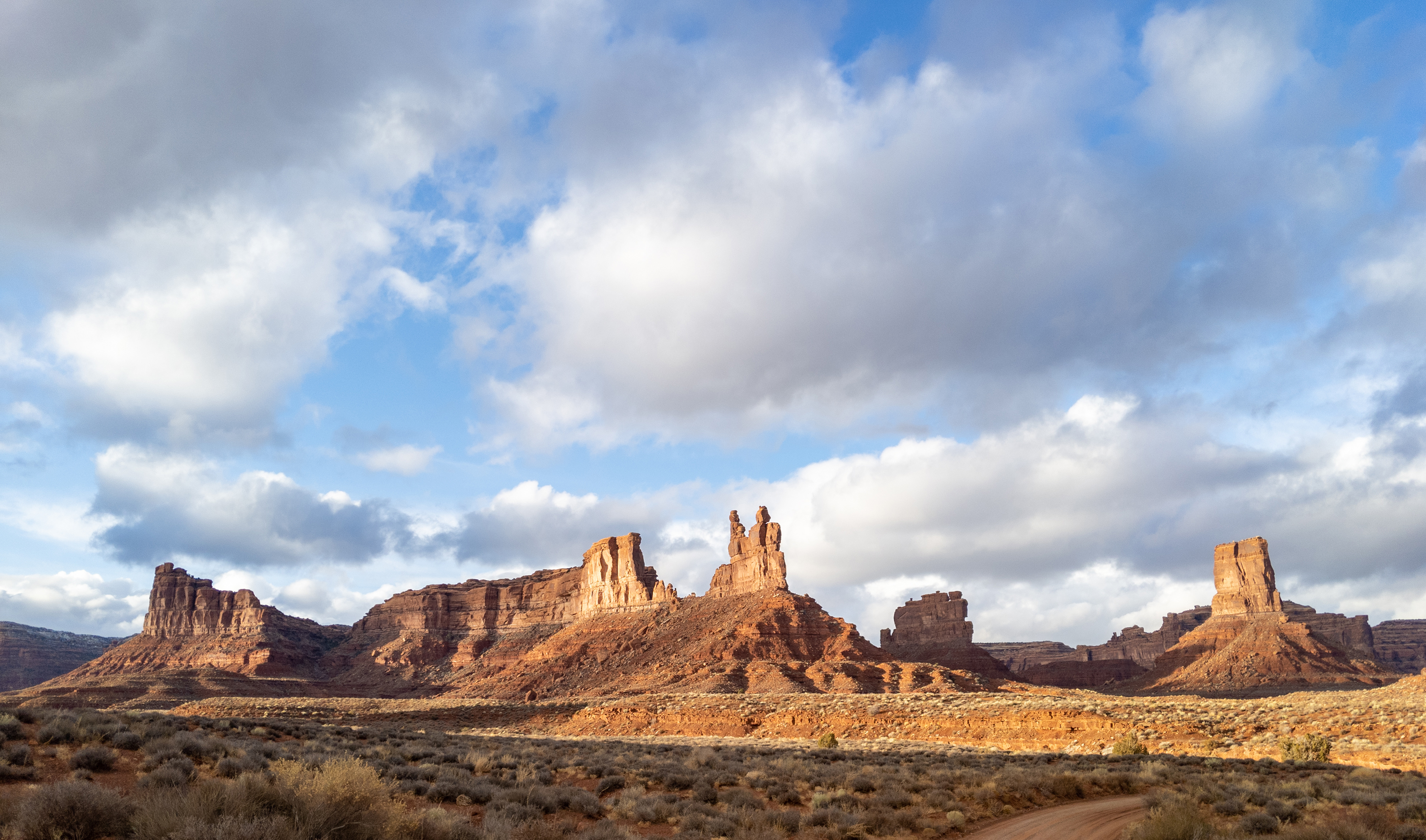
Valley of the Gods, 2019

The valley is public land managed by the Bureau of Land Management. No entrance fee is charged and no services are provided in the valley. Dispersed camping is permitted at previously disturbed sites, though campfires are not allowed.

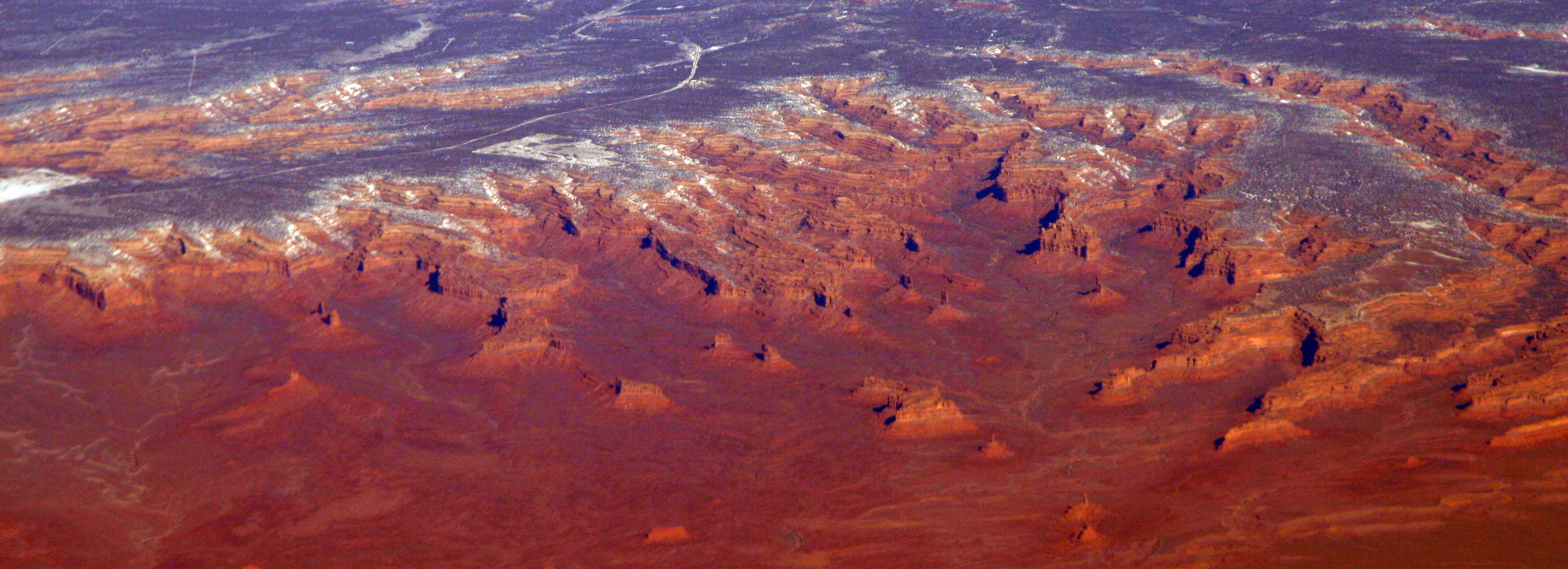
Aerial view of the Valley of the Gods
