= Seven Sailors =

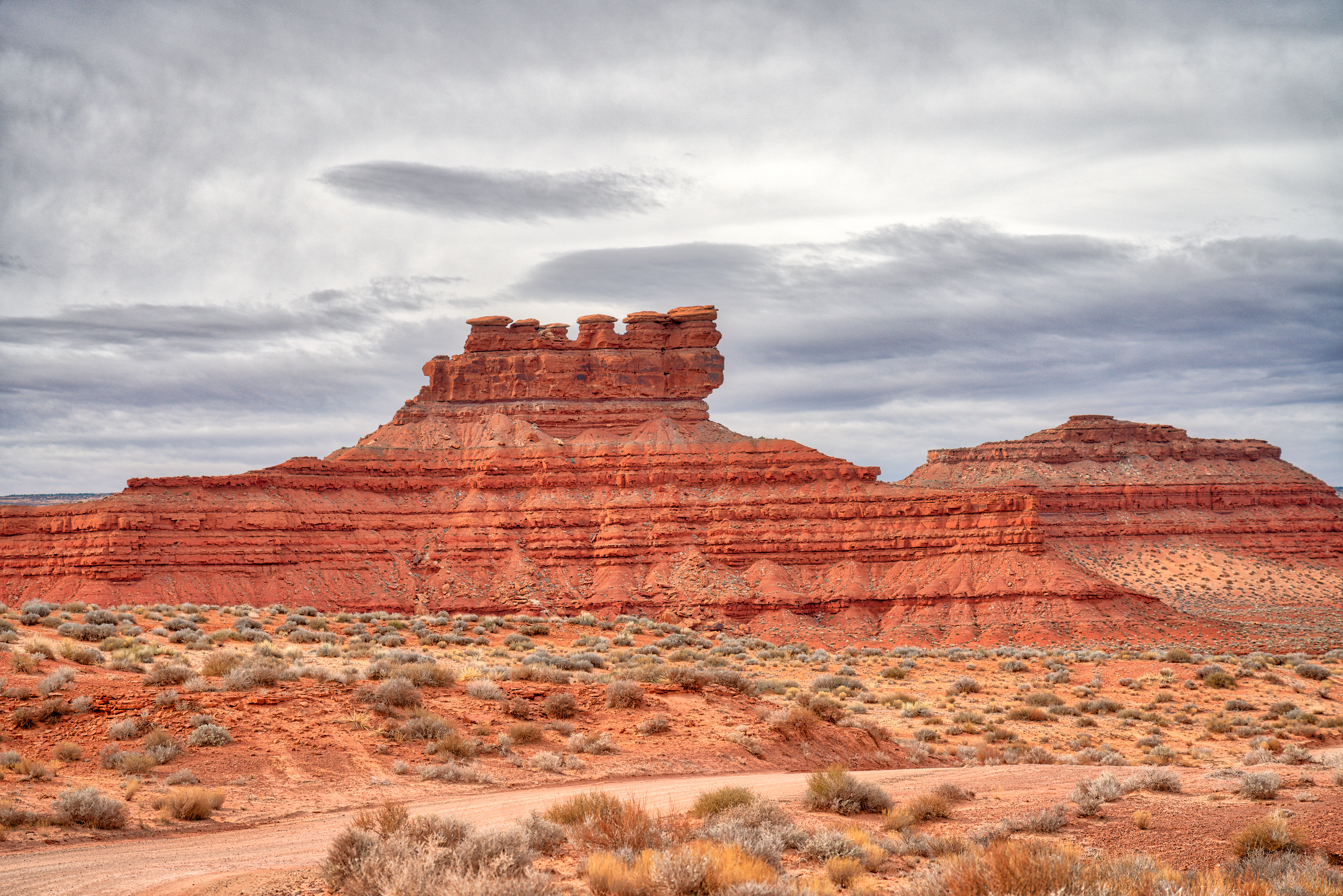
- East aspect

Highest point
- Elevation: 4,860 ft (1,481 m)
- Prominence: 320 ft (98 m)
- Parent peak: Rooster Butte
- Isolation: 2.39 mi (3.85 km)
- Coordinates: 37°14′36″N 109°49′27″W

Geography
- Location within Utah Location within the United States
- Location: Valley of the Gods; San Juan County, Utah, U.S.
- Parent range: Colorado Plateau
- Topo map: USGS Mexican Hat

Geology
- Rock age: Permian
- Rock type: Sandstone

Climbing
- Easiest route: class 5.9 climbing

Seven Sailors is a 4,860-foot-elevation (1,481-meter) pillar in San Juan County, Utah, United States.

== Description ==
Seven Sailors is situated 15 miles (24 km) west of Bluff, Utah, in the Valley of the Gods, on land administered by the Bureau of Land Management. Precipitation runoff from this landform drains to the San Juan River via Lime Creek. Access to the butte is via the 17-mile Valley of the Gods Road which starts at the intersection with Highway 163 near this butte. Topographic relief is significant as the summit rises 400 feet (122 meters) above the surrounding terrain in 0.1 mile (0.16 km). This landform's descriptive toponym has been officially adopted by the United States Board on Geographic Names.

== Geology ==
Seven Sailors is composed of two principal strata of the Cutler Formation. The bottom layer is slope-forming Halgaito Formation and the upper stratum is cliff-forming Cedar Mesa Sandstone. Cedar Mesa Sandstone is the remains of coastal sand dunes deposited about 270 to 300 million years ago, during the Wolfcampian (early Permian). The buttes of Valley of the Gods are the result of the Halgaito Formation being more easily eroded than the overlaying sandstone. The valley floor is Honaker Trail Formation.

== Climate ==
Spring and fall are the most favorable seasons to visit Seven Sailors. According to the Köppen climate classification system, it is located in a cold semi-arid climate zone with cold winters and hot summers. Summers highs rarely exceed 100 °F (38 °C). Summer nights are comfortably cool, and temperatures drop quickly after sunset. Winters are cold, but daytime highs are usually above freezing. Winter temperatures below 0 °F (−18 °C) are uncommon, though possible. This desert climate receives less than 10 inches (250 millimeters) of annual rainfall, and snowfall is generally light during the winter.

== Gallery ==
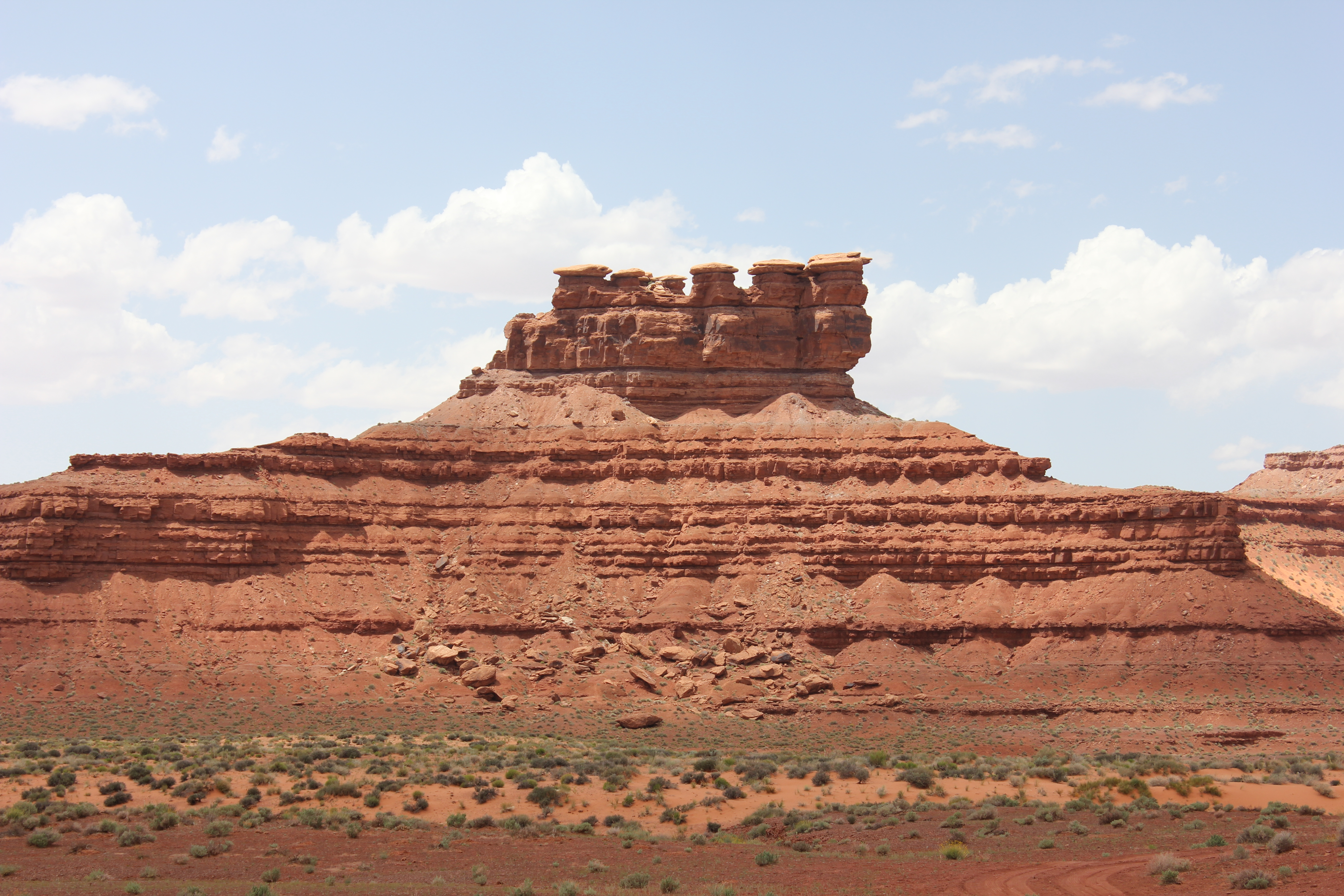
Seven Sailors

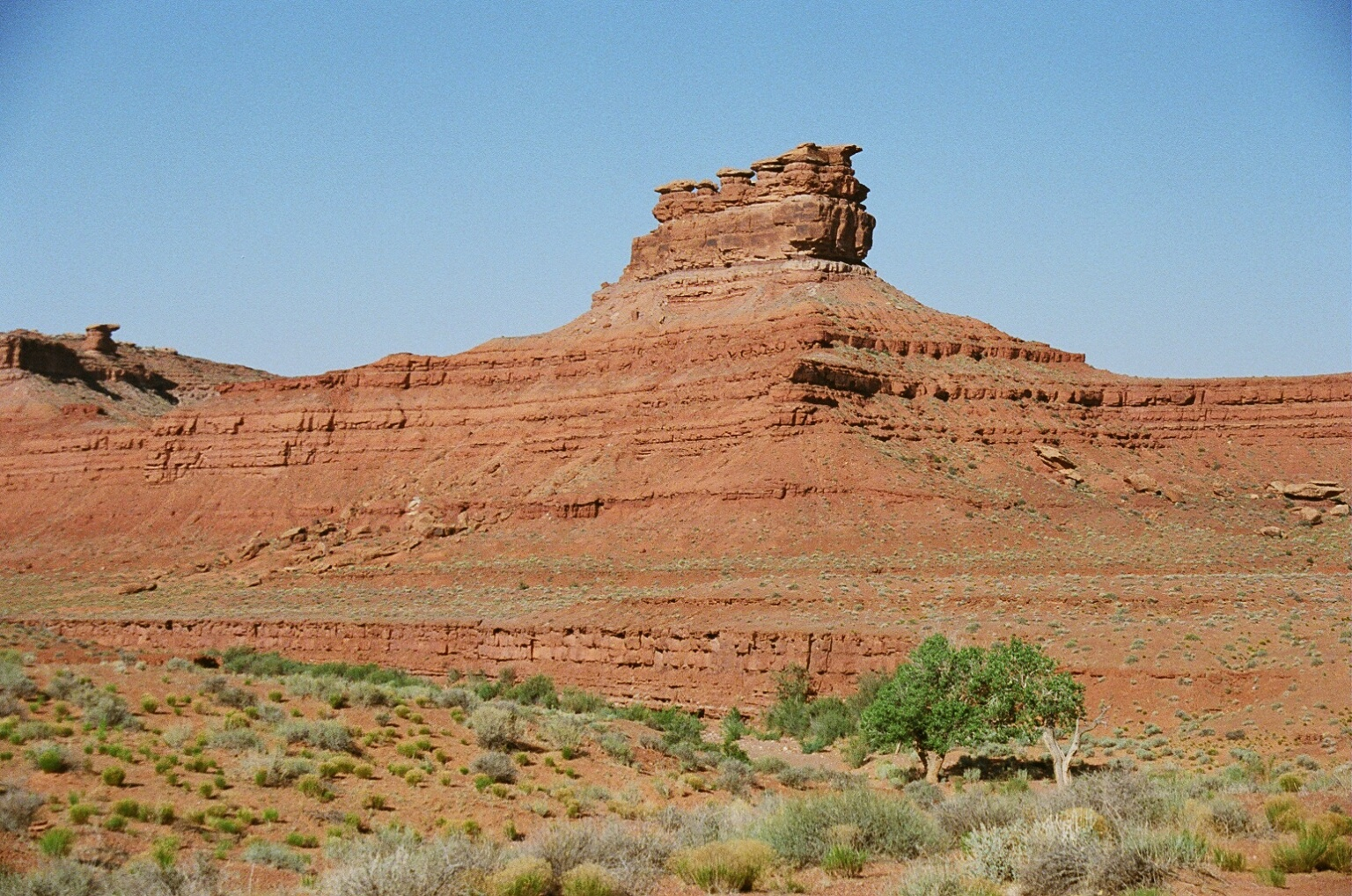
Northeast aspect

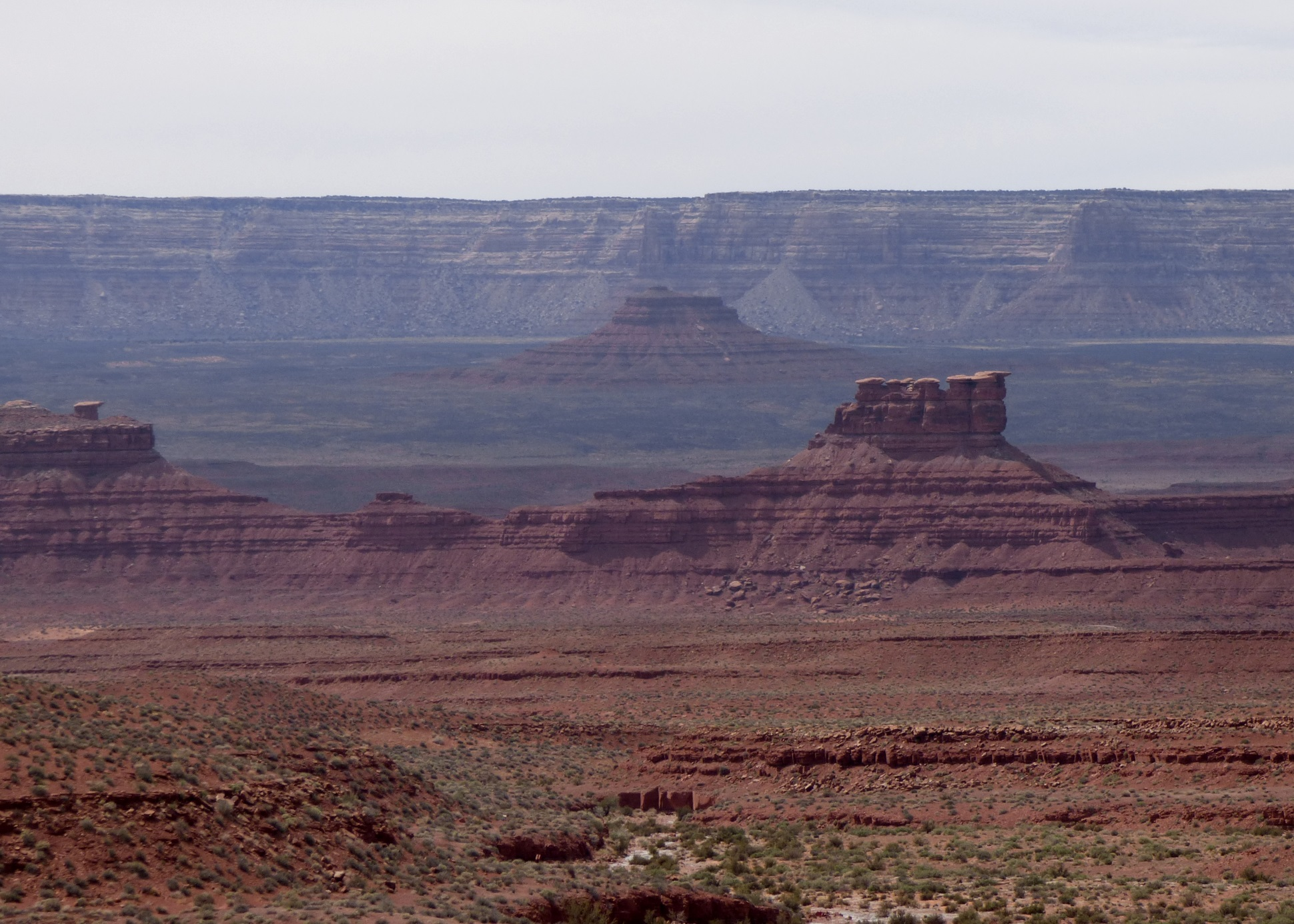
Seven Sailors right of center
