= De Gaulle and His Troops =

- North Tower
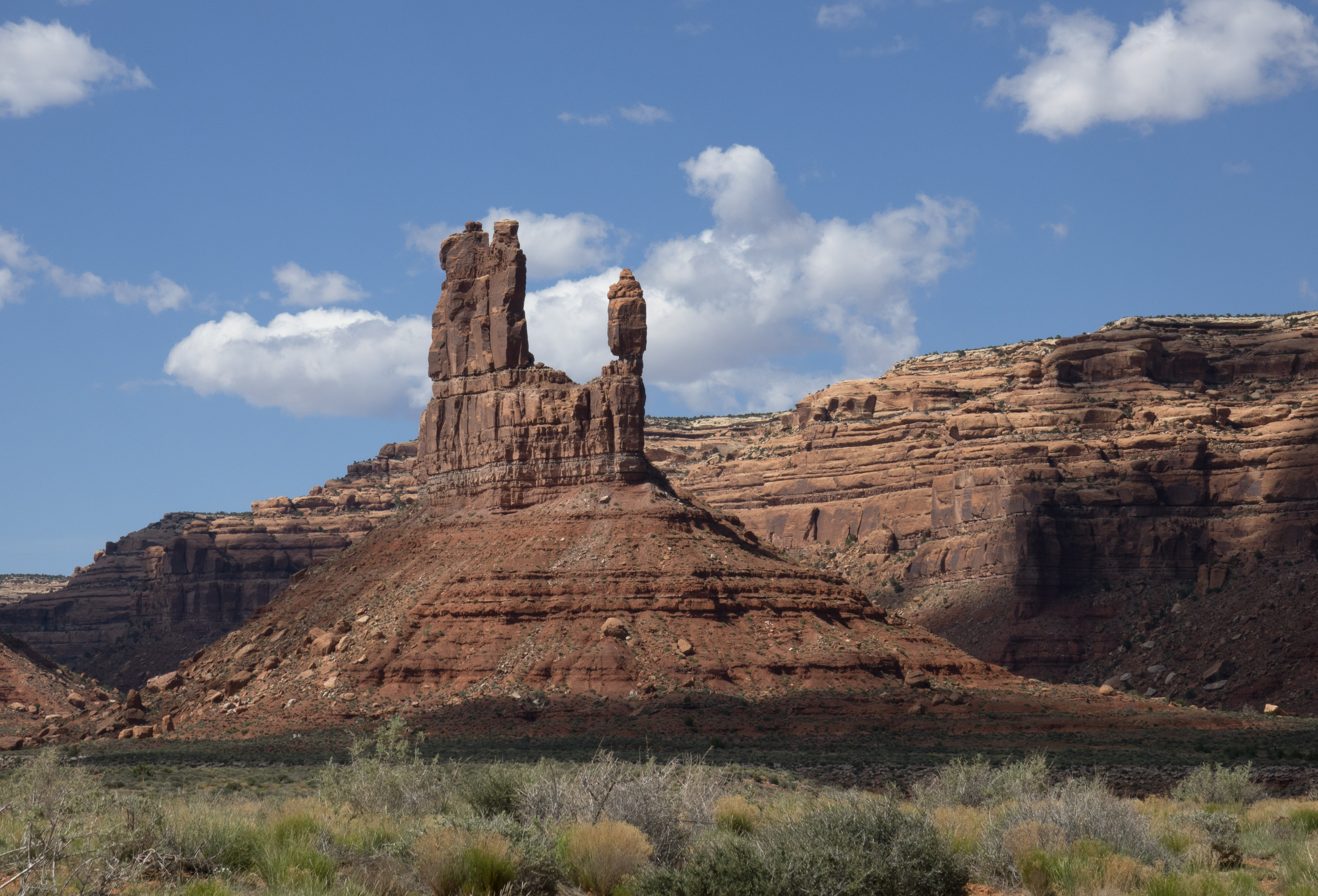
- South aspect

Highest point
- Elevation: 5,540 ft (1,689 m)
- Prominence: 400 ft (122 m)
- Parent peak: Bears Ears
- Isolation: 0.63 mi (1.01 km)
- Coordinates: 37°19′19″N 109°50′49″W

Naming
- Etymology: De Gaulle

Geography
- Location within Utah Location within the United States
- Location: Valley of the Gods; San Juan County, Utah, U.S.
- Parent range: Colorado Plateau
- Topo map: USGS Cigarette Spring Cave

Geology
- Rock age: Permian
- Mountain type: Butte
- Rock type: Sandstone

Climbing
- First ascent: 1974
- Easiest route: class 5.10+

De Gaulle and His Troops is a 5,540-foot-elevation (1,689-meter) summit in San Juan County, Utah, United States.

== Description ==
De Gaulle and His Troops is situated 16 miles (26 km) west of Bluff, Utah, in the Valley of the Gods, on land administered by the Bureau of Land Management. Precipitation runoff from this iconic landform's slopes drains to the San Juan River via Lime Creek. Access to the butte is via the 17-mile Valley of the Gods Road. Topographic relief is significant as the summit rises 540 feet (165 meters) above the surrounding terrain in 0.15 mile (0.24 km). This landform's toponym has not been officially adopted by the United States Board on Geographic Names, however it does appear on USGS topographic maps. Some rock climbers call this landform "North Tower."

== Climbing ==
The first ascent of the summit was made on June 11, 1974, by Eric Bjornstad and Ron Wiggle via a class 5.11 route called Serendipity. The Northeast Route was first climbed in 1983 by Brian Povolny and Will Taylor. The smaller attached tower to the south is descriptively named "Arrowhead Spire" (class 5.9) and was first climbed on March 20, 1993, by Frosty Weller and Randall Weekley. The first ascent of Arrowhead's Southeast Face was made in April 1994 by Jeff Widen and Rich McDonald.

== Geology ==
De Gaulle and His Troops is composed of two principal strata of the Cutler Formation. The bottom layer is slope-forming Halgaito Formation and the upper stratum is cliff-forming Cedar Mesa Sandstone. Cedar Mesa Sandstone is the remains of coastal sand dunes deposited about 270 to 300 million years ago, during the Wolfcampian (early Permian). The buttes of Valley of the Gods are the result of the Halgaito Formation being more easily eroded than the overlaying sandstone. The valley floor is Honaker Trail Formation.

== Climate ==
Spring and fall are the most favorable seasons to visit De Gaulle and His Troops. According to the Köppen climate classification system, it is located in a cold semi-arid climate zone with cold winters and hot summers. Summers highs rarely exceed 100 °F (38 °C). Summer nights are comfortably cool, and temperatures drop quickly after sunset. Winters are cold, but daytime highs are usually above freezing. Winter temperatures below 0 °F (−18 °C) are uncommon, though possible. This desert climate receives less than 10 inches (250 millimeters) of annual rainfall, and snowfall is generally light during the winter.

== Gallery ==
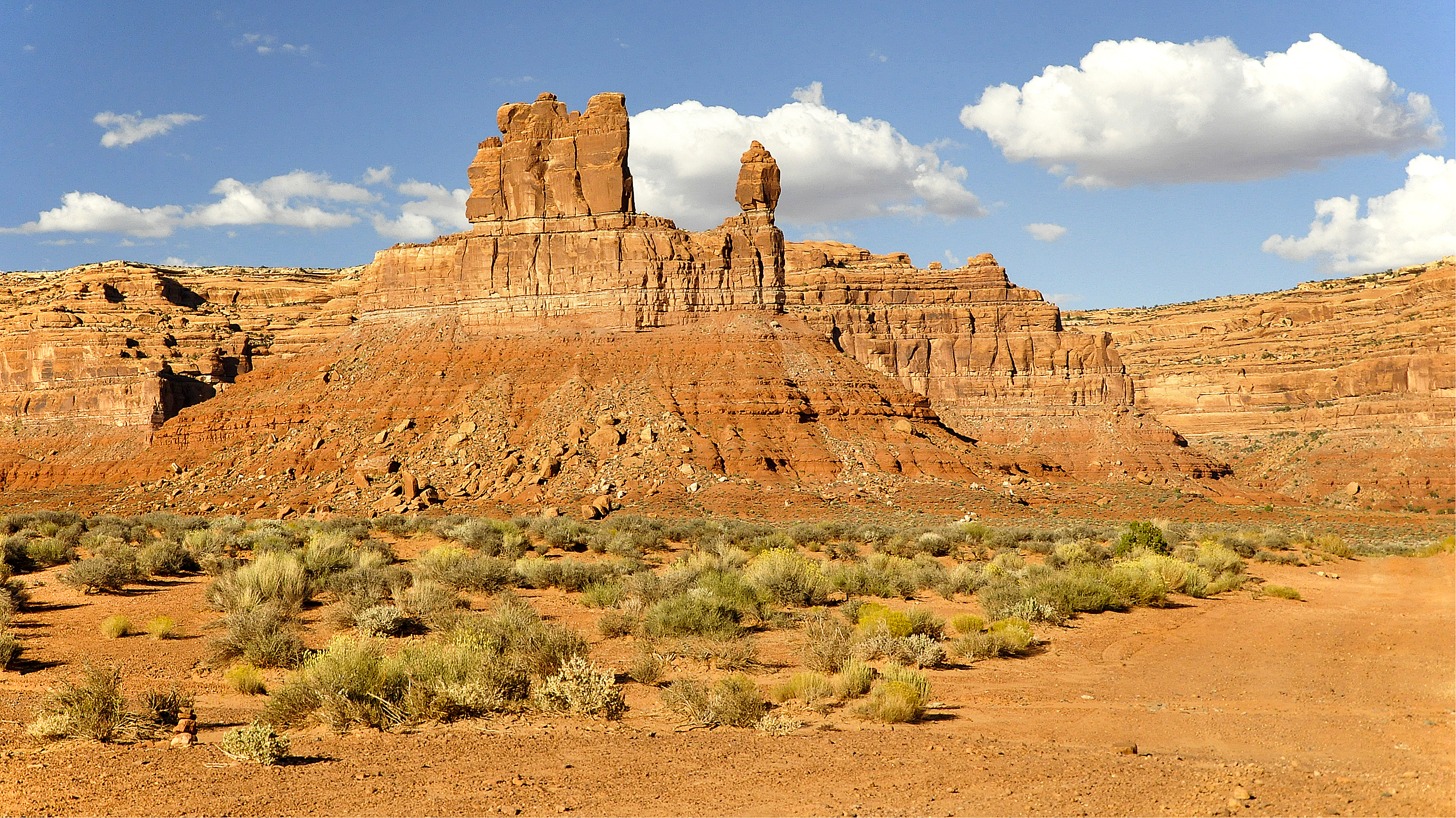
Southwest aspect

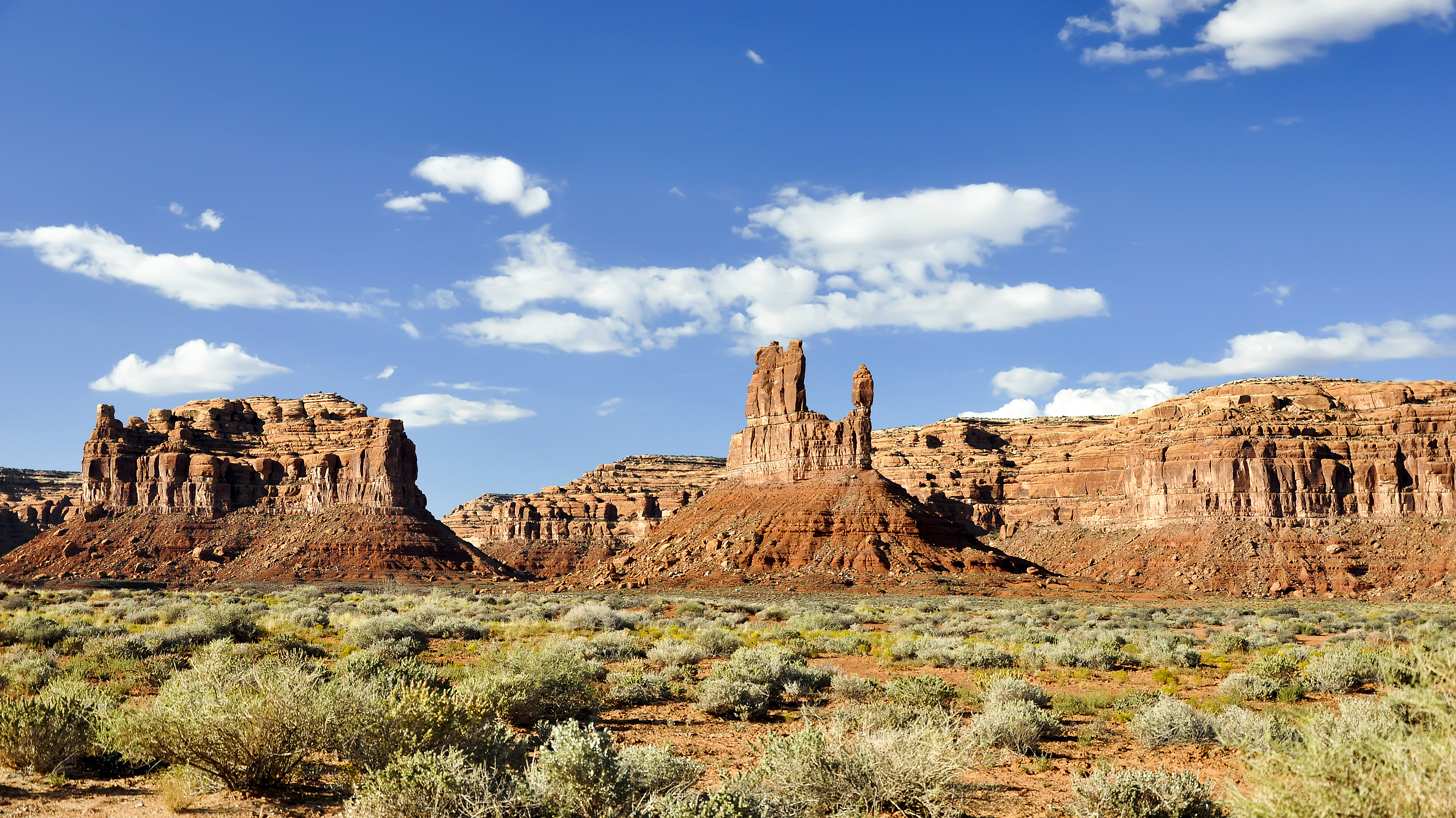

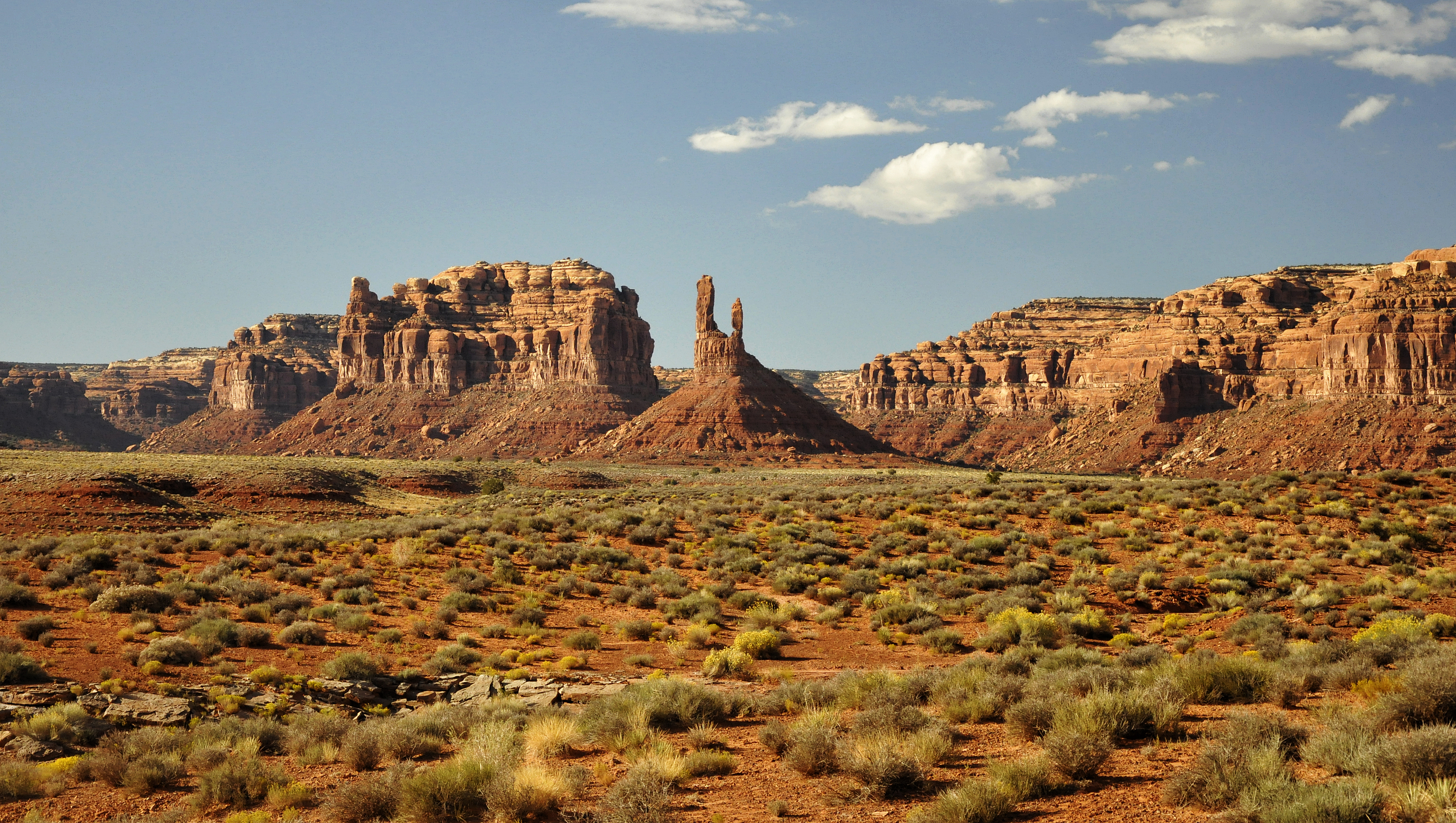
De Gaulle and His Troops centered

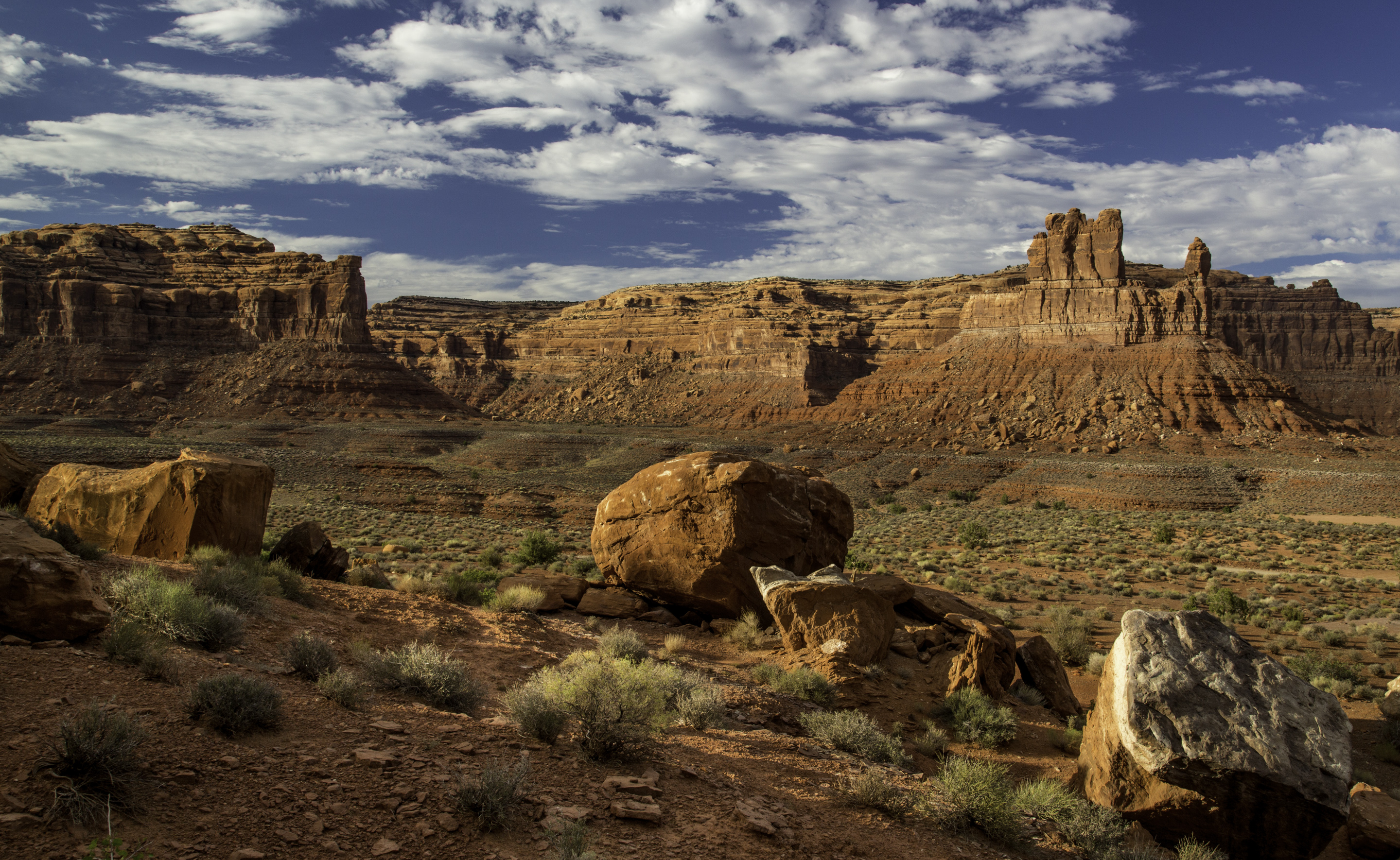
De Gaulle and His Troops to the right

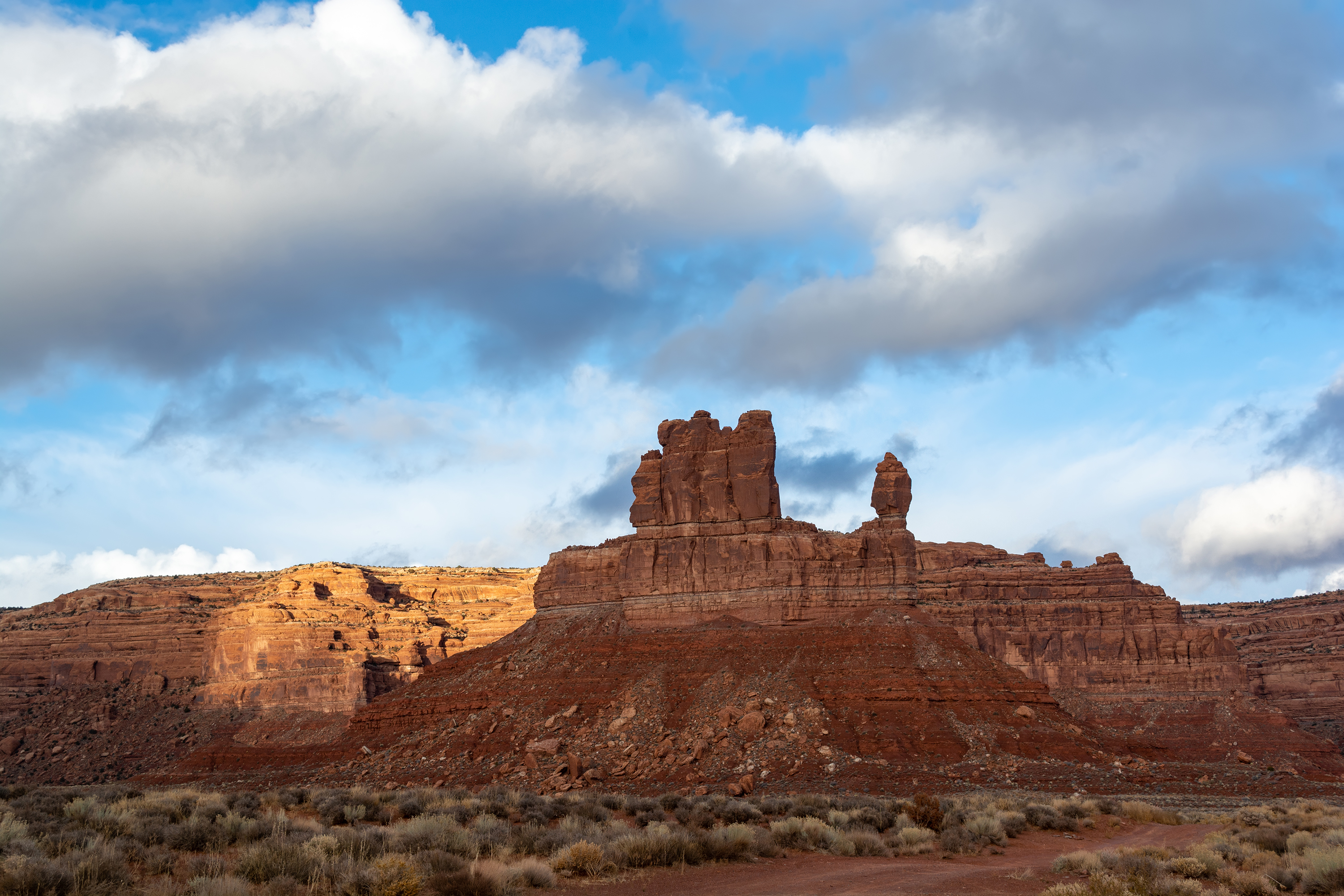

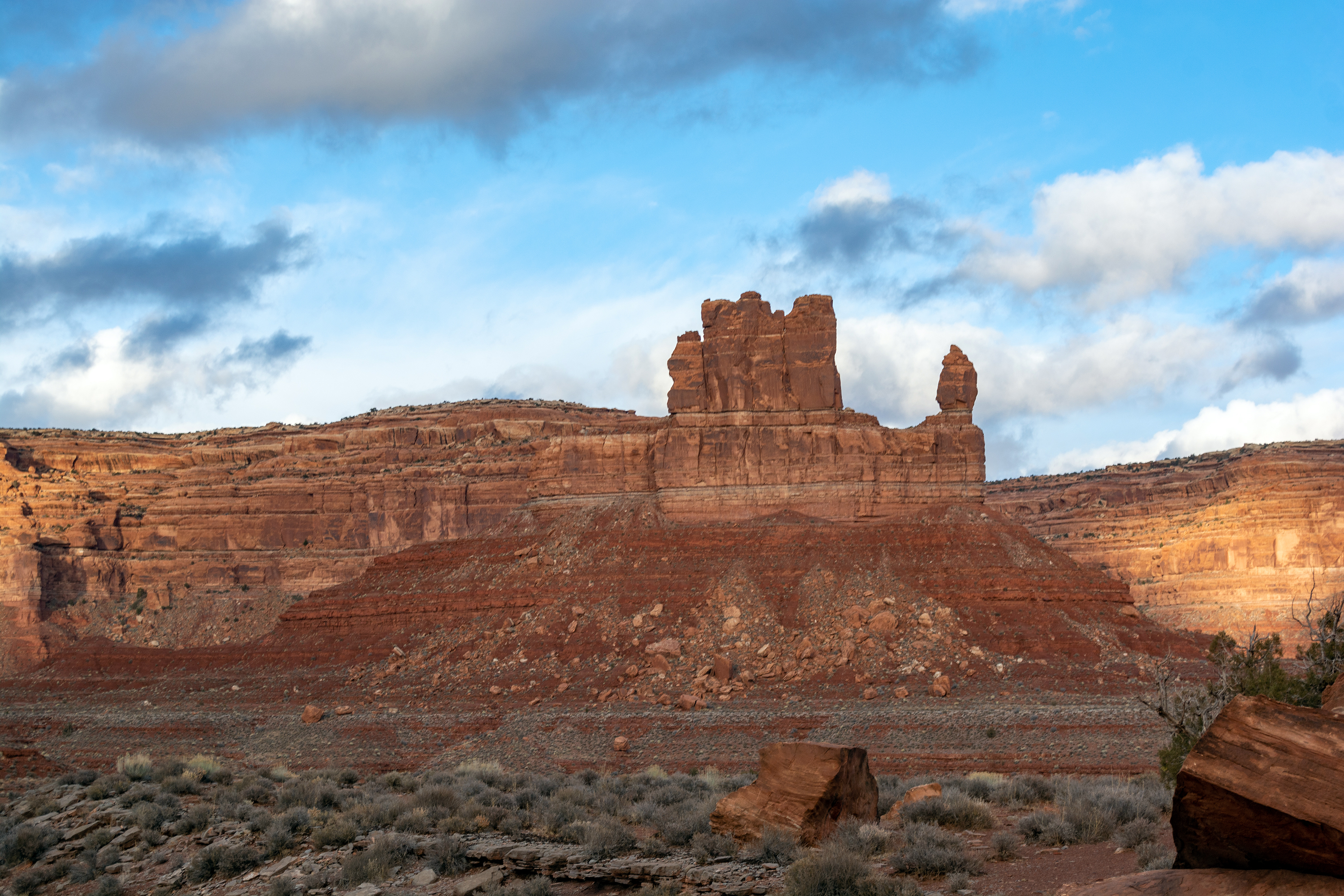

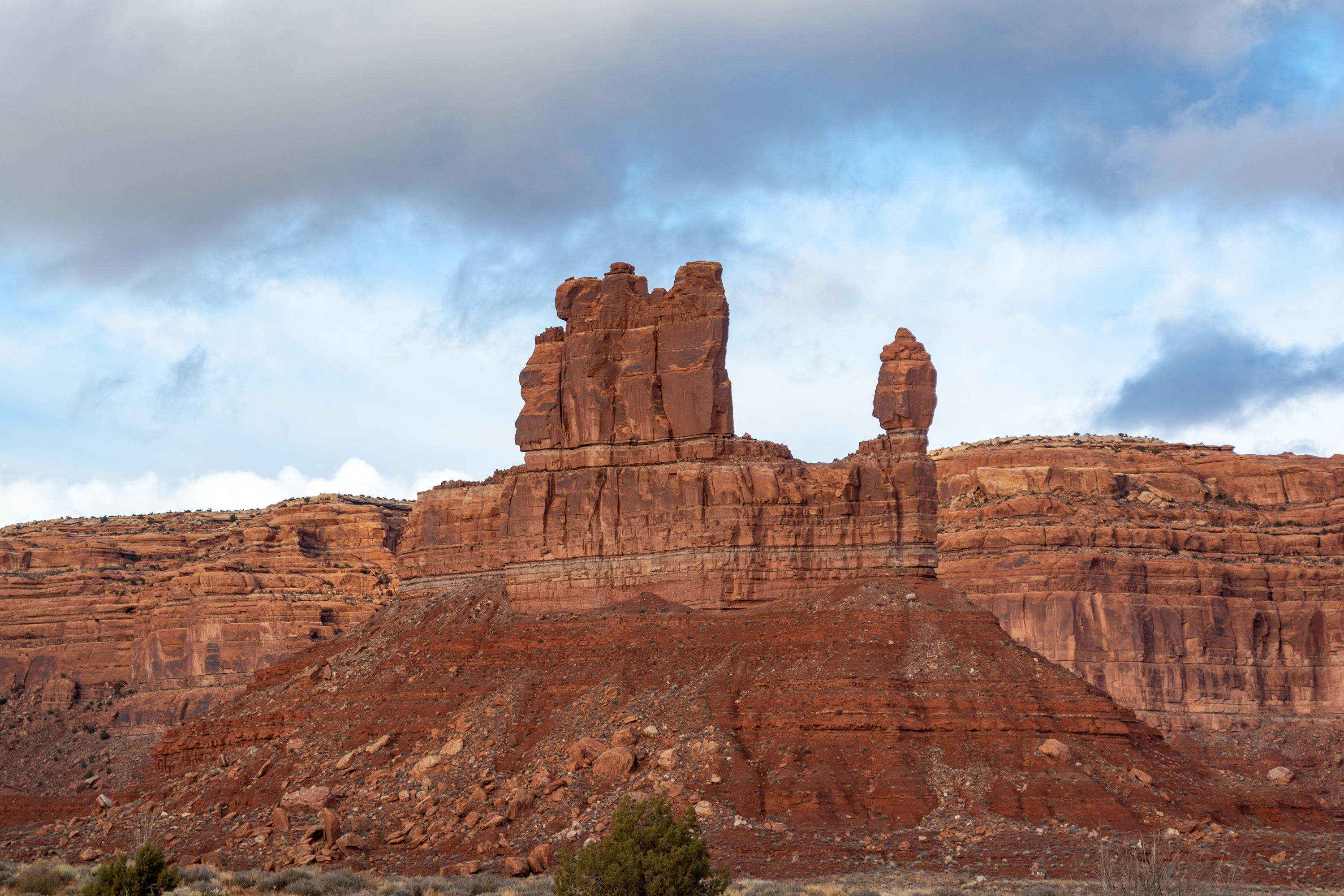

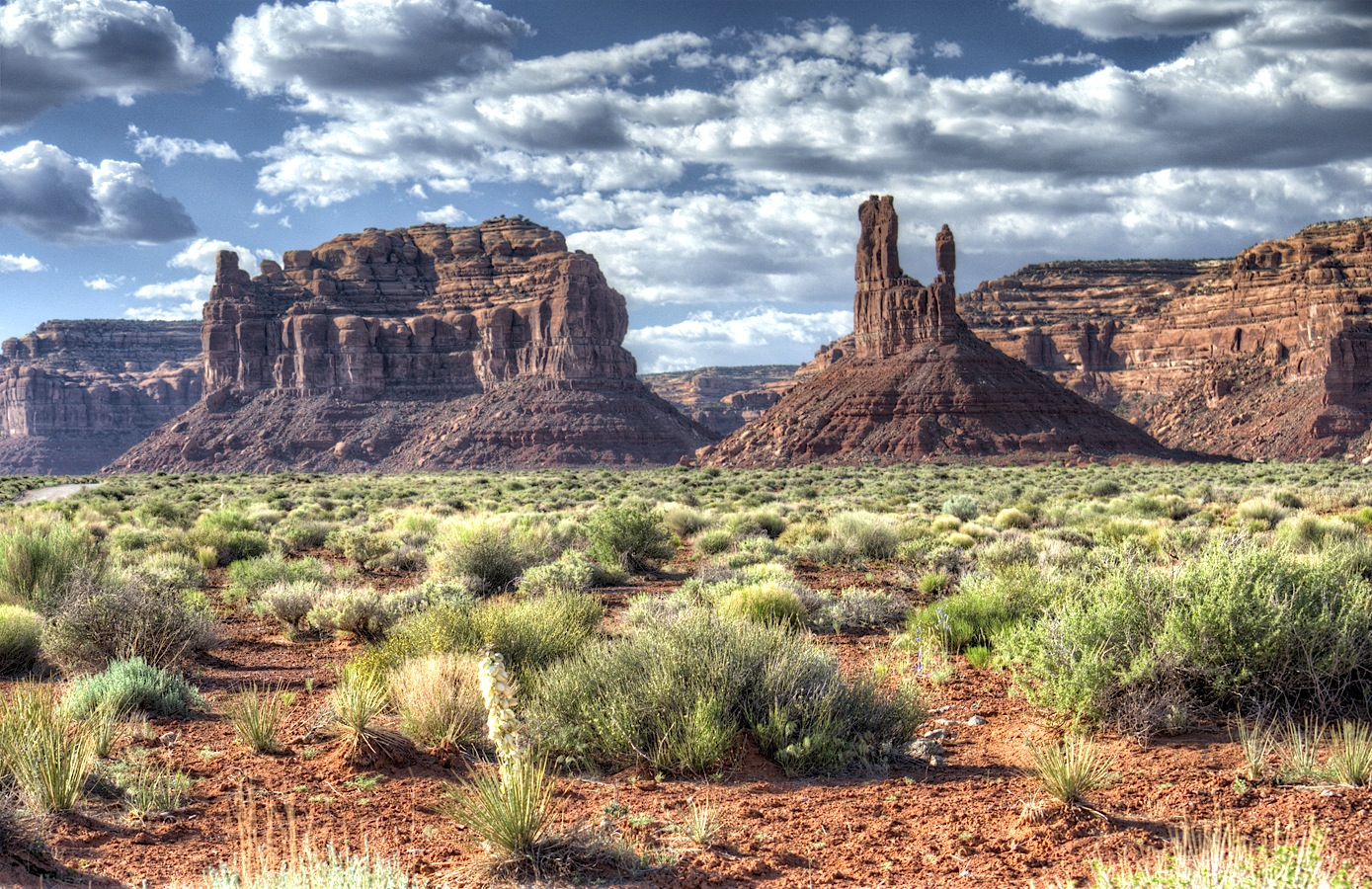
De Gaulle and His Troops to the right

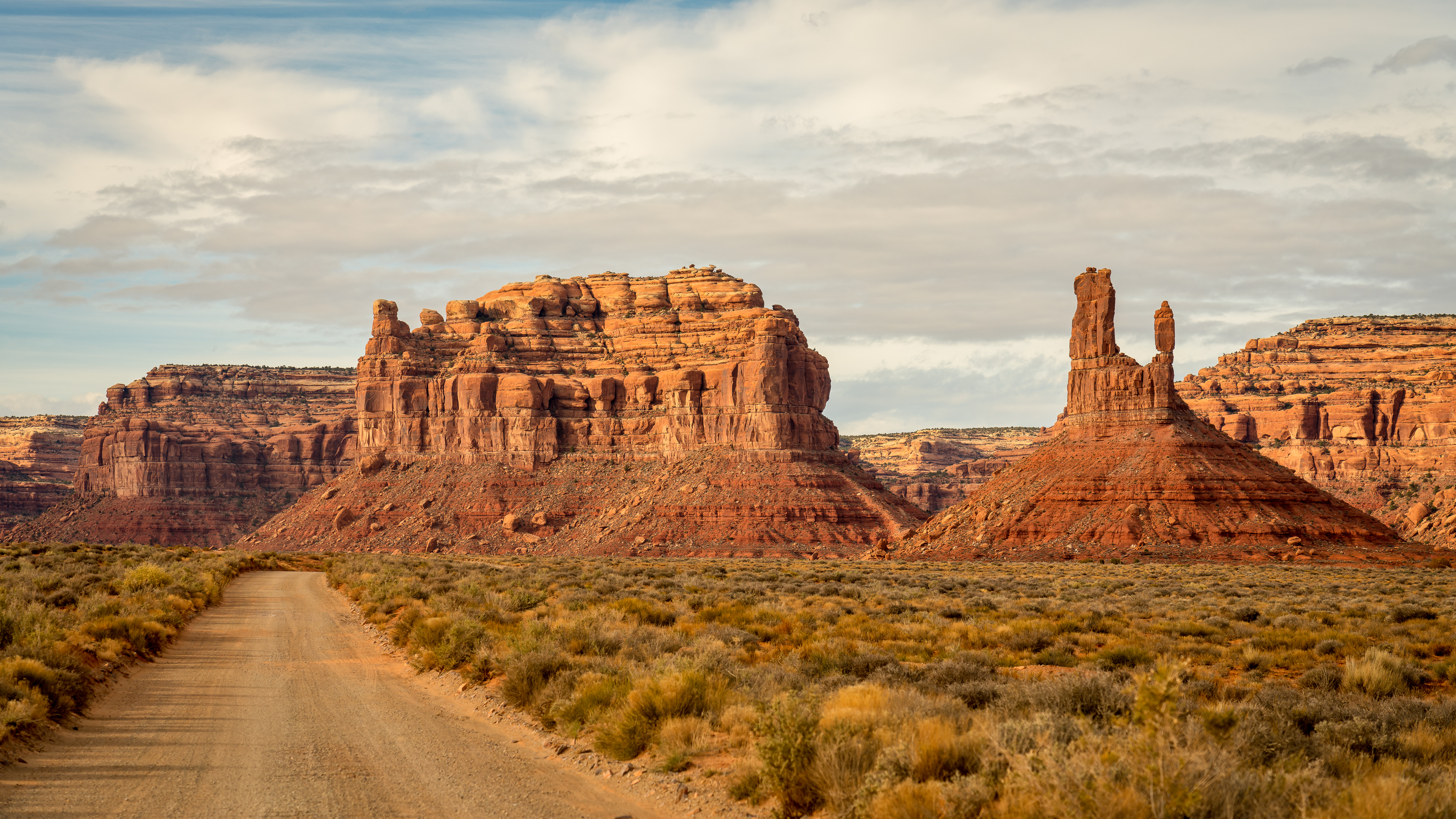
De Gaulle and His Troops to the right

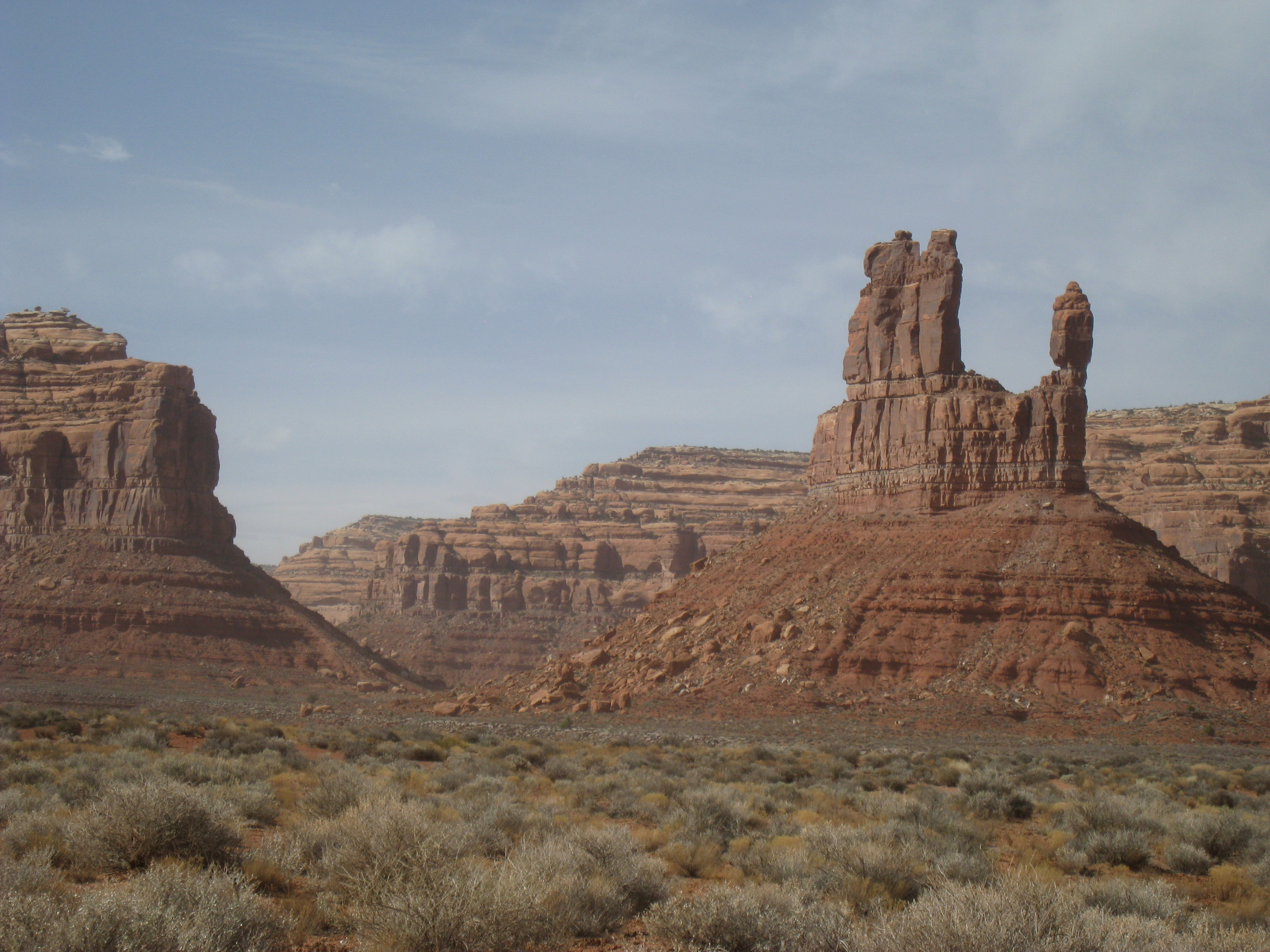
