= Lady in the Bathtub =

Rock formation in Utah, USA

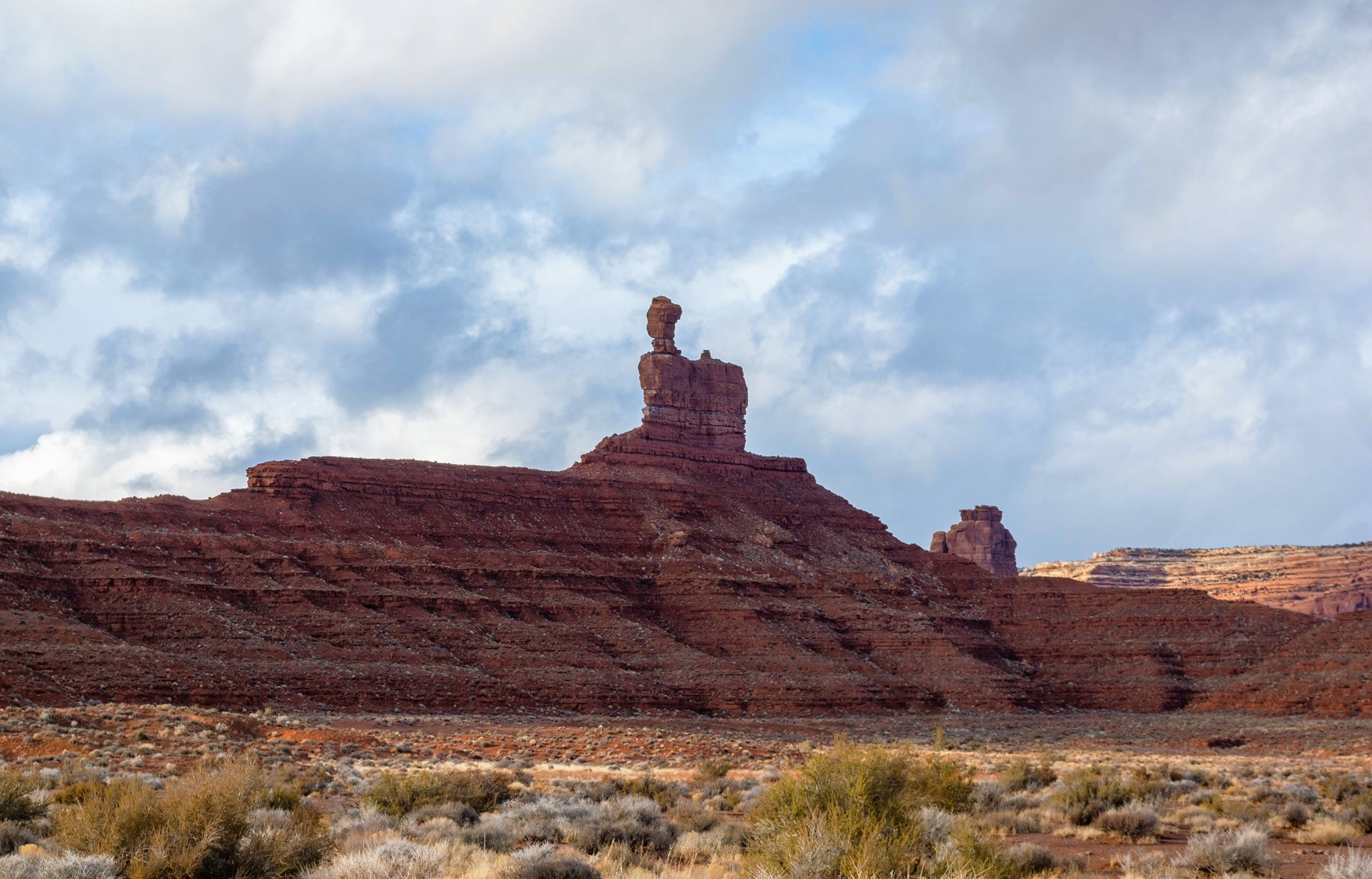
- Southeast aspect

Highest point
- Elevation: 5,552 ft (1,692 m)
- Prominence: 452 ft (138 m)
- Parent peak: Hidden Tower (5,774 ft)
- Isolation: 0.98 mi (1.58 km)
- Coordinates: 37°16′55″N 109°52′43″W

Geography
- Location within Utah Location within the United States
- Location: Valley of the Gods; San Juan County, Utah, U.S.
- Parent range: Colorado Plateau
- Topo map: USGS Cedar Mesa South

Geology
- Rock age: Permian
- Rock type: Sandstone

Climbing
- First ascent: 1978
- Easiest route: class 5.9 climbing

Lady in the Bathtub is a 5,552-foot-elevation (1,692-meter) pillar in San Juan County, Utah, United States.

== Description ==
Lady in the Bathtub is situated 17 miles (27 km) west of Bluff, Utah, in the Valley of the Gods, on land administered by the Bureau of Land Management. Topographic relief is significant as the summit rises 550 feet (168 meters) above the surrounding terrain in 0.2 mile (0.32 km). Precipitation runoff from this iconic landform's slopes drains to the San Juan River via Lime Creek. Access is via the 17-mile Valley of the Gods Road. This landform's descriptive toponym was officially adopted in 1988 by the United States Board on Geographic Names. The first ascent of the summit was made on September 26, 1978, by George Hurley and Bill Forrest.

== Geology ==
Lady in the Bathtub is composed of two principal strata of the Cutler Formation. The bottom layer is slope-forming Halgaito Formation and the upper stratum is cliff-forming Cedar Mesa Sandstone. Cedar Mesa Sandstone is the remains of coastal sand dunes deposited about 270 to 300 million years ago, during the Wolfcampian (early Permian). The buttes of Valley of the Gods are the result of the Halgaito Formation being more easily eroded than the overlaying sandstone. The valley floor is Honaker Trail Formation.

== Climate ==
Spring and fall are the most favorable seasons to visit Lady in the Bathtub. According to the Köppen climate classification system, it is located in a cold semi-arid climate zone with cold winters and hot summers. Summers highs rarely exceed 100 °F (38 °C). Summer nights are comfortably cool, and temperatures drop quickly after sunset. Winters are cold, but daytime highs are usually above freezing. Winter temperatures below 0 °F (−18 °C) are uncommon, though possible. This desert climate receives less than 10 inches (250 millimeters) of annual rainfall, and snowfall is generally light during the winter.

== See also ==
- Castle Butte (Valley of the Gods)

== Gallery ==
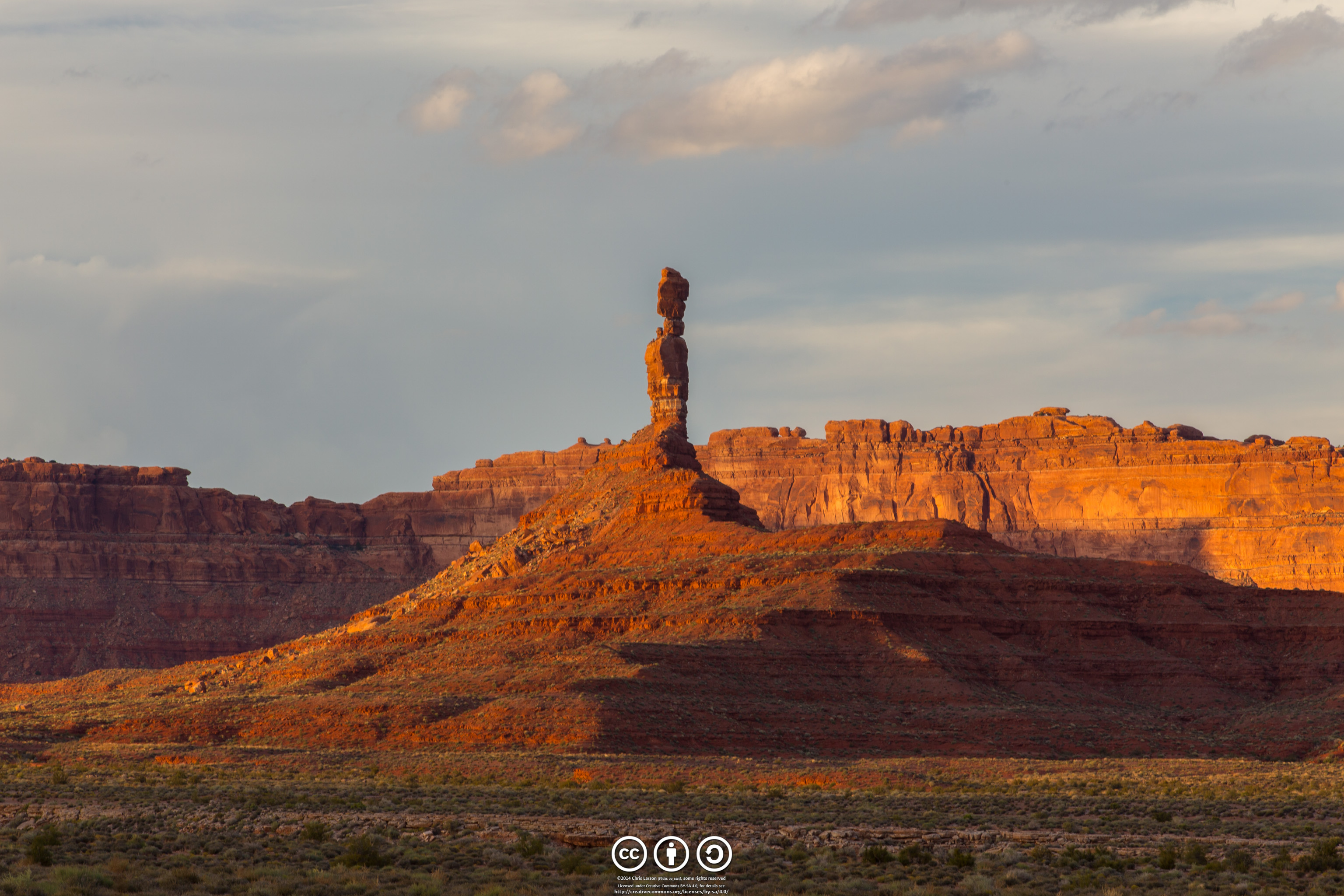
Lady in the Bathtub viewed edgewise from the south

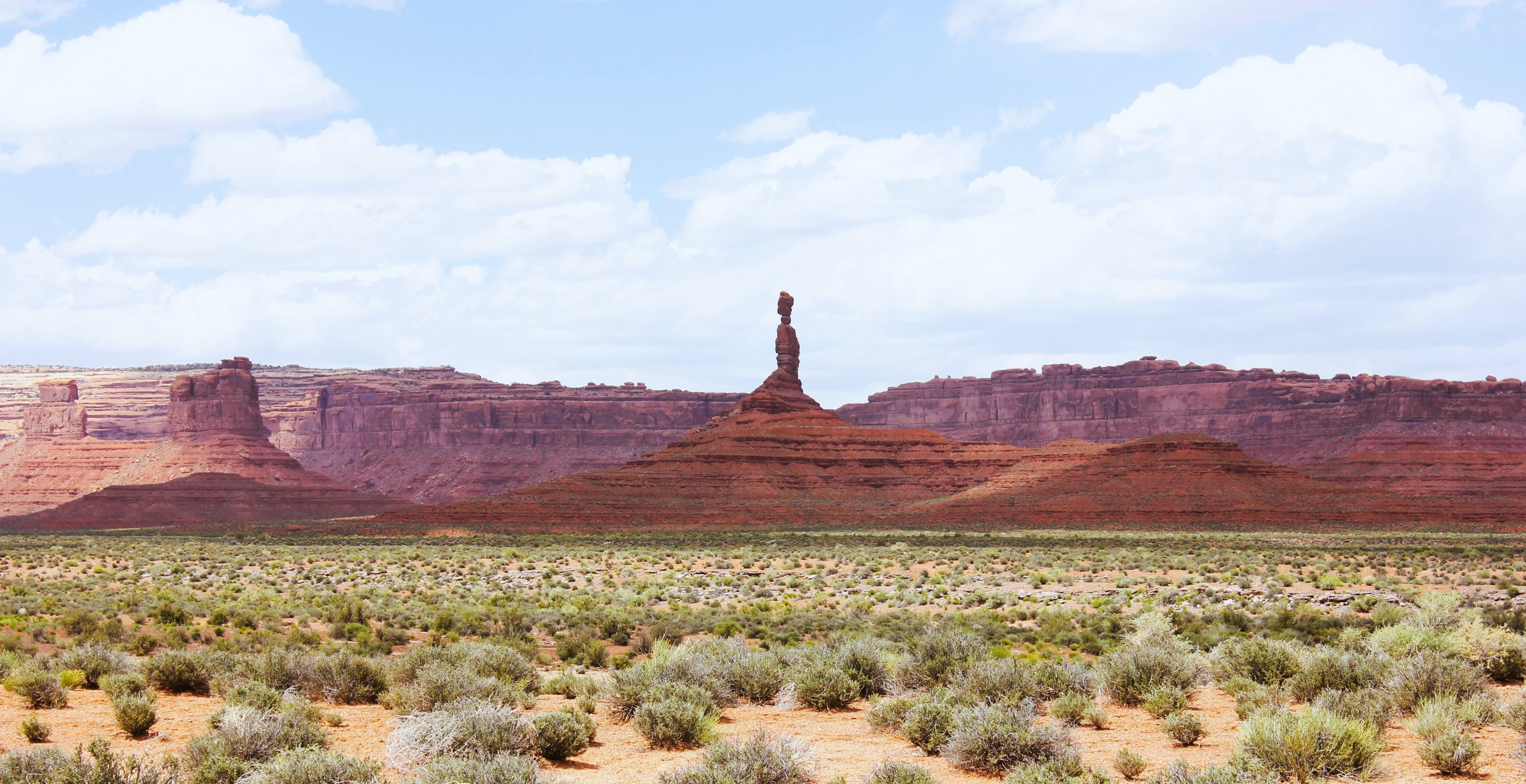
Lady in the Bathtub (center) viewed edgewise from the south.
"Hidden Tower" (5,774') to the left.

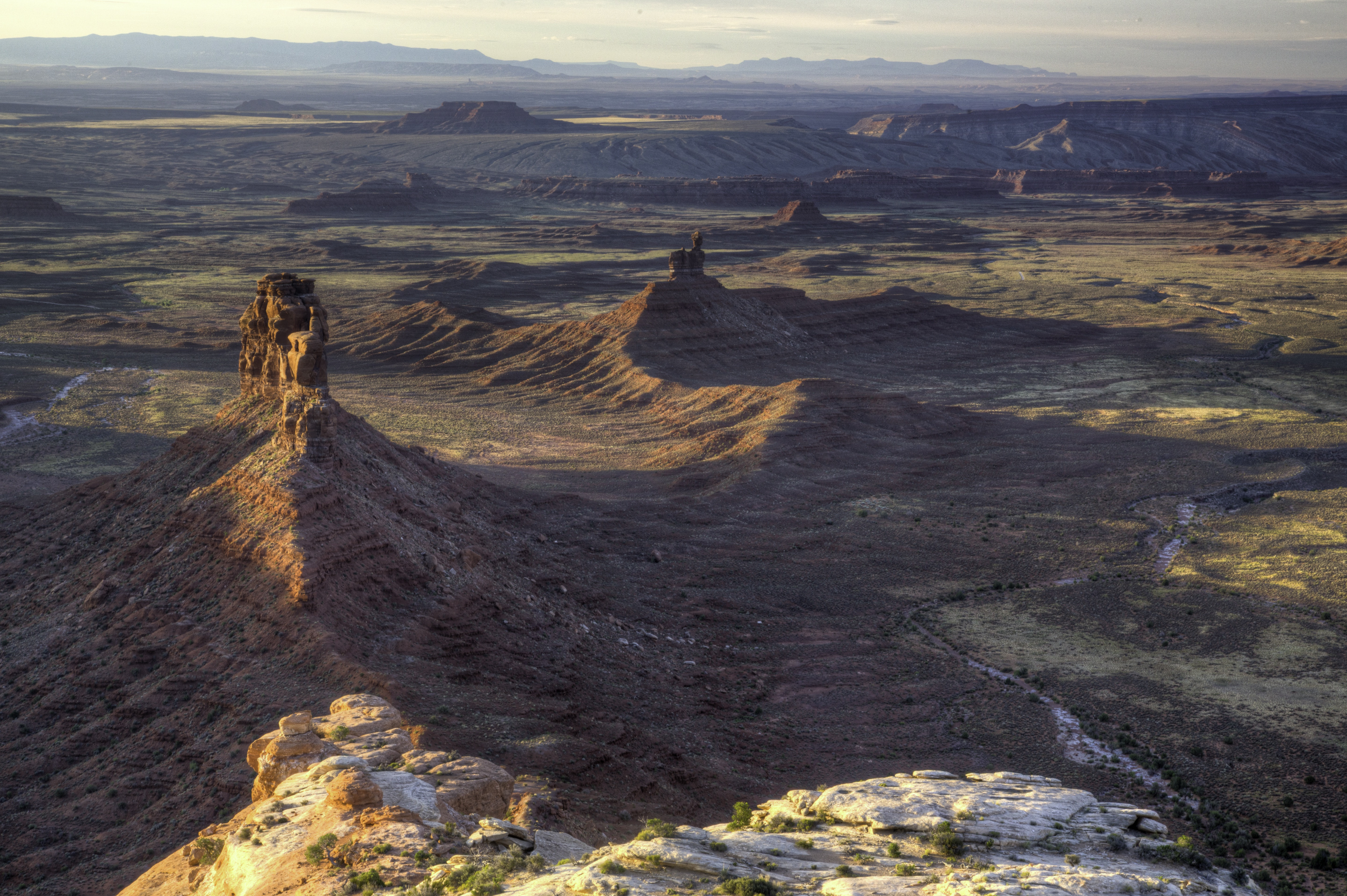
Lady in the Bathtub (centered) viewed from northwest. Hidden Tower to left.

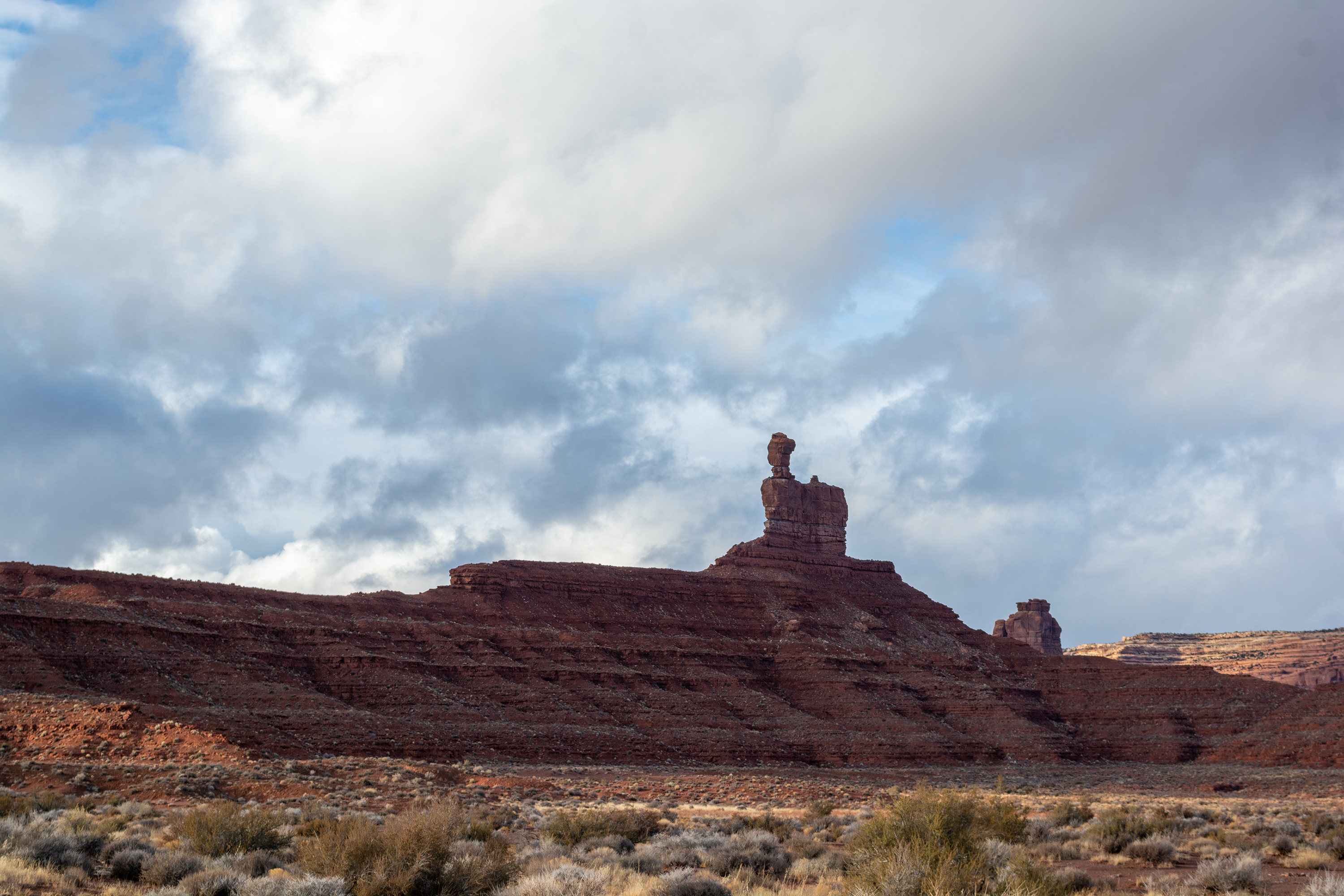
Southeast aspect

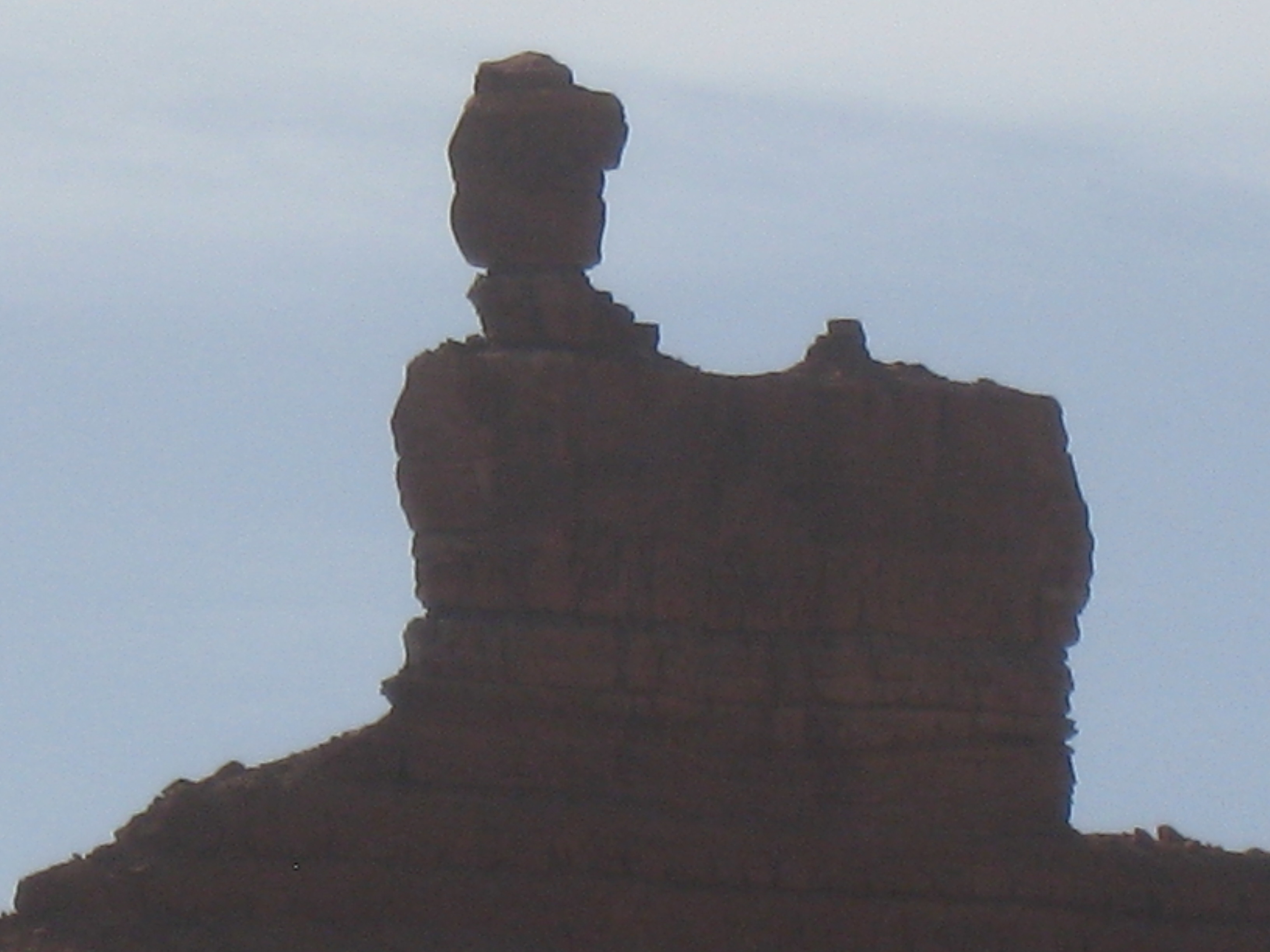

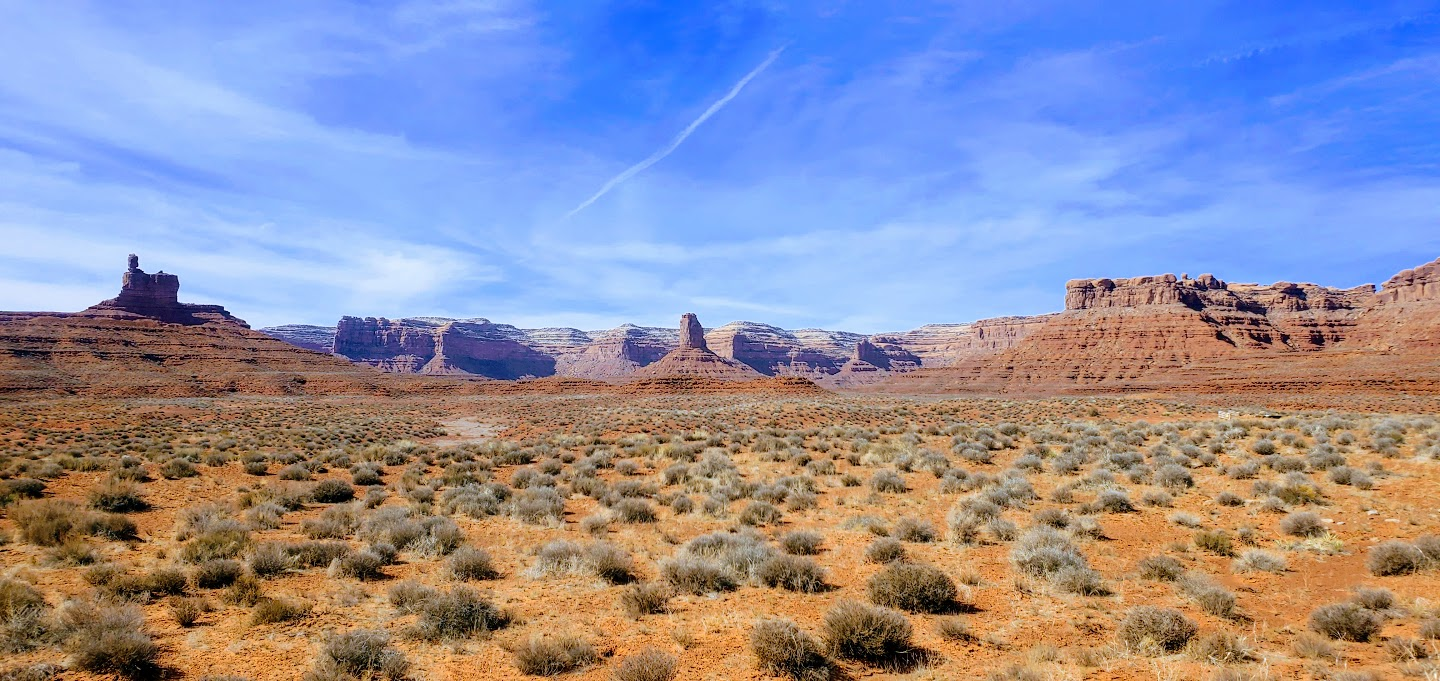
Lady in the Bathtub at far left
