= Paddy Martinez =

American prospector (1881–1969)

Mary and Paddy Martinez in 1952

Patricio "Paddy" Martinez (1881– August 26, 1969) was an American prospector and sheepherder who discovered uranium at Haystack Mesa in the San Juan Basin near Grants, New Mexico, in 1950. This was the first discovery in the Grants Uranium District, and led to a uranium boom that lasted almost 30 years. The San Juan Basin contained 60% of the known uranium resources in the United States, valued at over $25 billion.

== Discovery of uranium in New Mexico ==
Martinez's discovery, in 1950 on Santa Fe Railroad land, was developed into the Haystack mine. He was hired by the railroad and Anaconda Mining Company as a uranium scout for $400 per month, a good salary then. Following the discovery, the town of Grants became a yellowcake boomtown; its population grew from 2,200 to 50,000 within a few months. The mining boom lasted for decades, until the 1980s when it collapsed. The Santa Fe Railroad continued to pay Martinez $250 per month until the day he died.

After his first discovery, in 1950 of carnotite, a low-grade uranium-bearing ore, he staked a claim on 160 acres (65 ha). After that he explored Haystack Mountain where he made the discovery of high-grade ore. He became nationally known for his discovery.

== Personal life ==
Martinez was born in the village of Haystack, New Mexico. He and his wife Flora had 14 children.

Martinez, a Navajo of Mexican descent, and a native New Mexican, became famous for his discovery. He was the subject of feature articles in Time, Life, True West and Reader's Digest magazines. Martinez was fluent in the Navajo, Laguna (Keresan), Spanish and English languages. He was a medicine man and a leader in his community.

Martinez also worked as a law officer on the Navajo reservation, ran a mountain sheep camp and worked as a labor recruiter for carrot farms.

His tombstone at Grants Memorial Cemetery simply reads, "Paddy Martinez 1881 - 1969 Uranium Pioneer." His grave is near Paddy Martinez Park, where children play.

External image
- Paddy Martinez in 1956, on the discovery outcrop. Life magazine photo.

== Legacy ==
Martinez was inducted into the National Mining Hall of Fame in 1992.
