= San Juan Basin =

Structural basin in the Southwestern United States

Coordinates: 36.27°N 107.90°W

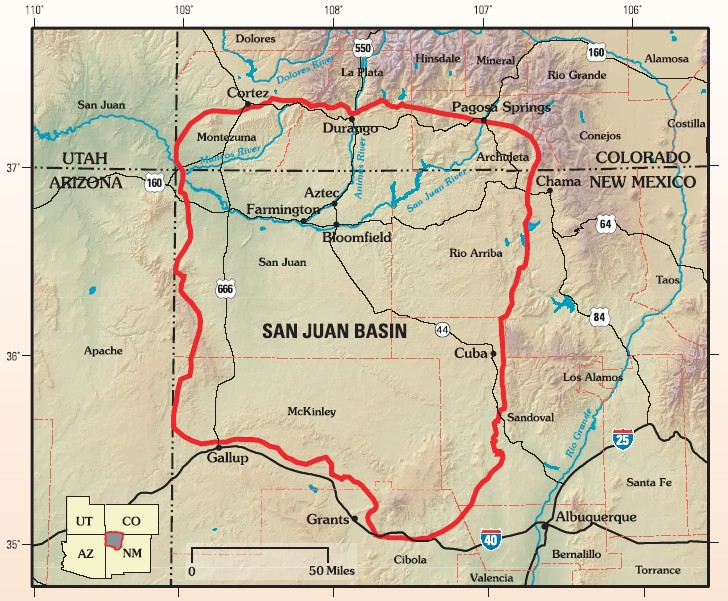
The San Juan structural basin is primarily in New Mexico and the southeast corner of the Colorado Plateau.

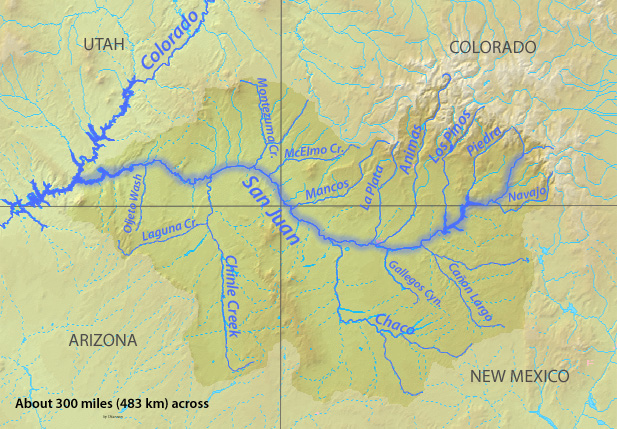
The San Juan structural basin is generally the east portion of the San Juan River Watershed of 24,600 sq mi (64,000 km^{2}) which extends farther west into Utah and Arizona.

The San Juan Basin is a geologic structural basin located near the Four Corners region of the Southwestern United States. The basin covers 7,500 square miles and resides in northwestern New Mexico, southwestern Colorado, and parts of Utah and Arizona. Specifically, the basin occupies space in the San Juan, Rio Arriba, Sandoval, and McKinley counties in New Mexico, and La Plata and Archuleta counties in Colorado. The basin extends roughly 100 miles (160 km) N-S and 90 miles (140 km) E-W.

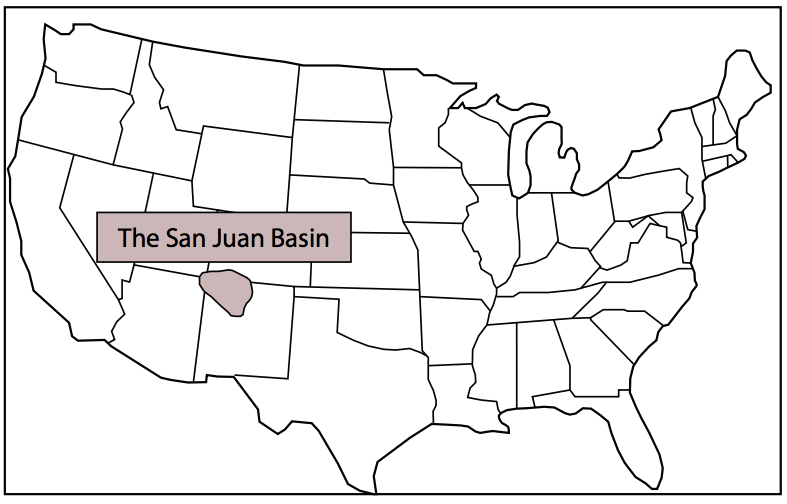
Location of the San Juan Basin on a map of the United States.

The San Juan Basin is an asymmetric structural depression in the Colorado Plateau province, with varying elevation and nearly 3,000 feet (910 m) in topographic relief. Its most striking features include Chaco Canyon (northwestern New Mexico, between Farmington and Santa Fe) and Chacra Mesa. The basin lies west of the Continental Divide, and its main drainage is the southwest- to west-flowing San Juan River, which eventually joins the Colorado River in Utah. Climate of the basin is arid to semiarid, with an annual precipitation of 15 in (380 mm) and an average annual temperature of around 50 °F (10 °C).

The San Juan Basin has been a major producer of oil and natural gas since the early 20th century, with currently more than 300 oil fields and over 40,000 drilled wells throughout the area. As of 2009, cumulative production reached 42.6 trillion cubic feet of gas and 381 million barrels of oil. The area is especially known for gas reservoirs from its coal-bed methane formations. The San Juan Basin contains the largest coal-bed methane field in the world and ranks second in total gas reserves.

== Tectonic evolution ==
=== Ancestral Rockies ===
During the mid-Paleozoic, the San Juan Basin was part of the ancient landmass called Laurentia; this was a supercontinent that contained much of current-day North America. The ancient landmass called Gondwana contained most of the southern continents, e.g. South America and Africa. During the late-Mississippian (~320 million years ago), the landmasses of Laurentia and Gondwana collided to form the giant landmass of Pangea. This continental collision resulted in several pivotal orogenic (mountain building) episodes.

The collision of supercontinents Gondwana and Laurentia resulted in the Alleghanian and Ouachita orogenies. The Alleghanian Orogeny was the collision of Africa with the current-day southeastern United States, and resulted in the Appalachian Mountains. The Ouachita Orogeny was the collision of South America with the current-day Gulf-region, and resulted in the Ancestral Rockies - a northwest trending intercontinental mountain belt mainly through Texas, New Mexico, and Colorado. The Ancestral Rockies gave way to the Uncompahgre Mountain Range, which bound the San Juan Basin on the northeast.

=== Mesozoic subduction ===
During the late Jurassic, continental collision of the Farallon and North American plates resulted in low-angle ("flat slab") subduction beneath the western margin of the United States. Pressure on the underlying lithosphere resulting in a "depression" of the continents interior, and this allowed for the formation of the Inner Cretaceous Seaway (a.k.a. Western Interior Seaway). This began the transition from terrestrial sedimentation during the late Paleozoic and early Mesozoic to a shallow marine basin, as waters from the Arctic and Gulf regions poured into the center of the continent.

=== Cenozoic evolution ===
Base map of the San Juan Basin. Modified from Fassett, 2010.

During late Cretaceous to early Tertiary, compressional forces (continued subduction of the Farallon Plate) continued to act and caused the uplift of the modern Rocky Mountains via the Laramide Orogeny. Early-Tertiary tilting towards the northwest resulted in over 2,000 feet (610 m) of erosion in the southeast. As compression shifted to extension and the formation of the Rio Grande Rift began, volcanism dominated the area throughout much of the Eocene and Oligocene. Uplift in the northwest and continued deposition brought the basin to its current-day configuration.

=== Components ===
The San Juan Basin is an asymmetrical syncline with three components: the Central Basin Platform, the Four Corners Platform, and the Chaco Slope (a.k.a. the Chaco Homocline). The basin is bound on the northwest by the Hogback Monocline (separating the Central Basin and Four Corners platforms), on the northeast by the Archuleta Anticlinorium, on the east by the Nacimiento Uplift, and on the south by the Zuni Uplift.

== Depositional history ==
=== Paleozoic ===
Depiction of the Cretaceous Western Interior Seaway.

Prior to collision, Mississippian- and Pennsylvanian-aged units were deposited during various marine environments, e.g. the Leadville Limestone and the Pinkerton Trail Formations. Once the supercontinents collided (see Tectonic Evolution above), the subsidence of the Paradox Basin and the uplift of the Uncompahgre highlands allowed for enormous amounts of sediment to shed off the highlands via Permian fluvial systems. The Rico Formation represents the transition from Pennsylvanian marine deposits to Permian terrestrial deposits of the Cutler Formation. The Permian continued to be a time of terrestrial deposits, including late-Permian eolian deposits.

=== Mesozoic ===
The Cretaceous was a time of three major transgressive-regressive cycles, as eustatic changes in sea-level caused fluctuations on the Western Interior Seaway's shoreline. The San Juan Basin was conveniently located in the western margin of the seaway and recorded these cycles in the stratigraphy (see Stratigraphy below). The westernmost extent of the seaway (a.k.a. maximum transgression) was recorded by the Lewis Shale, which eventually graded into the Pictured Cliffs and the Fruitland Formation as the shoreline made its final retreat.

=== Cenozoic ===
The Western Interior Seaway's shoreline regression resulted in ample swamps, lakes, and flood plains; this resulted in the coal-rich formations of the late Mesozoic/early Cenozoic (e.g. Fruitland Formation and the Kirtland Shale). Eocene/Oligocene volcanism resulted in large volcanic aprons that covered thousands of square-kilometers, and these volcanic fields sourced the Cenozoic units the Ojo Alamo (sourced from the west), and the Animas and Nacimiento formations (sourced from the northeast). Uplift in the northwest (and subsequent erosion), and continued deposition (e.g. the San Jose Formation) brought the basin to its current-day configuration.

== Stratigraphy ==
Generalized cross section of the San Juan Basin.

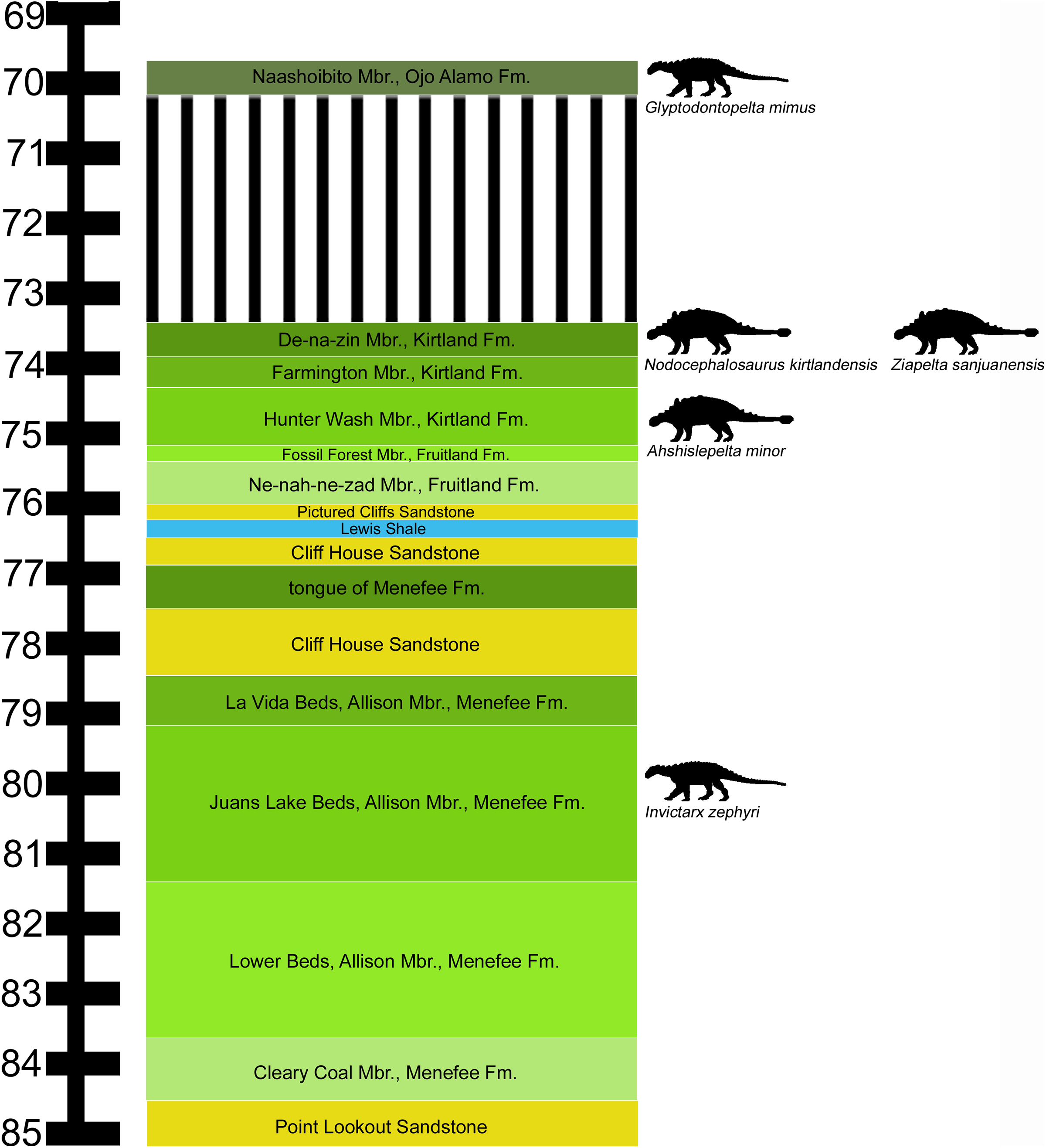
San Juan Basin Upper Cretaceous stratigraphy

=== Precambrian ===
Little is known about Precambrian units due to poor outcrop exposure and poor well-control. Precambrian rocks consist of quartzite, schist, and granite, and rocks are overlain unconformably by younger Paleozoic units.

=== Paleozoic ===
Little is known about the stratigraphy of the Paleozoic. Of the >40,000 wells drilled in the San Juan Basin, only about 12 have penetrated deep enough to come in contact with Paleozoic units. Additionally, poor outcrop exposure and lateral facies changes complicate the defining and correlation of these units.

==== Devonian ====
- The Ignacio Formation consists of quartzite, sandstone, and shale layers. The unit is argued to be Late Devonian in age and was deposited by an east-trending transgression (unconformably) covering Precambrian rock throughout the present-day Four Corners Platform. Preservation of the Ignacio is poor and mostly limited to localized areas of down-thrown faults.

- The Aneth Formation consists of dark limestone, clay-rich dolomite, and black shale or siltstone layers. This Late Devonian-aged unit has a depositional environment similar to that of the Ignacio Formation, though the two formations rest unconformably over one another. The Aneth Formation is found only in the subsurface, cropping out nowhere.
- The Elbert Formation consists of two members:
  - The McCracken Sandstone Member consists of poorly-sorted sandstones sourced from the east. Exposures can be found in the San Juan Mountains unconformably overlying Cambrian units.
  - The unnamed upper member consists of green shales, white sandstones, and thin limestone or dolomite beds deposited in a tidal-flat environment.
- The Ouray Formation consists of fossil-rich (brachiopods, gastropods, crinoids, etc.) limestone or dolomite beds that conformably overlie the previous unit. Fossil faunas are indicative of a Late Devonian (and possibly early Mississippian) marine environment.

==== Mississippian ====
- The Leadville Limestone consists of shallow marine, open marine, and carbonate shelf deposits. This unit has yielded over 50 million barrels of oil in Colorado and Utah.
- The Molas Formation consists of three members:
  - The Coalbank Hill Member is a residual soil deposit that consists of red to brown siltstones, cherts, and conglomerates. It may rest conformably over the Leadville Limestone or unconformably over the Ouray Formation.
  - The middle member consists of red-brown siltstones, sandstones, and conglomerates reflective of stream deposits. This unit rests unconformably over the Coalbank Hill Member.
  - The upper member is similar to the preceding middle member, but also contains fossiliferous limestone indicative of a transgressing shoreline.
- The Log Springs Formation is stratigraphically equivalent to the Molas Formation and lithologically similar to the Coalbank and middle members of the Molas Formation.

==== Pennsylvanian ====
- The Pinkerton Trail (north) and the Sandia (south) formations consists of grey argillaceous or fossiliferous limestone and calcareous shale beds. The units were deposited during a southwest to westward transgressing sea.
- The Paradox Formation contains complex, cyclic evaporite deposits of alternating porous salts and non-porous shales/limestones. These work as excellent stratigraphic traps for hydrocarbons.
- The Honaker Trail Formation consists of basal open marine limestones and dolomites overlain by arkosic sandstones from the northern Uncompahgre highland. The early 1,400' thick unit conformably overlies the Paradox Formation.
- The southern equivalent of the Paradox and Honaker Formations is the Madera Group. Its lower section consists of grey shales and limestones of the Gray Mesa Formation that grades into the upper, acrostic sandstone-rich Atrasado Formation. Total thickness is nearly 1,300'.
- The transition from Pennsylvanian marine units to Permian continental units is represented by the Rico Formation. It consists of conglomerates and arkosic sandstones interbedded with marine shales and fossiliferous limestones.

==== Permian ====
- The Cutler Group consists of alluvial fan deposits from north and northeastern sources (e.g., the Uncompahgre and the San Luis highlands). Deposits include arkosic sandstones, conglomerates, and minor siltstones and mudstones. The Cutler Group is divided into several formations:
  - The Halgaito Formation consists of alternating marginal marine and fluvial sediments, and it conformably overlies the Rico Formation.
  - The Cedar Mesa Sandstone varies with location, but contains evaporite, fluvial, tidal-flat, and sabkha facies.
  - The Organ Rock Formation contains siltstones and sandstones from coastal-plain and fluvial deposits sourced from the north.
  - The De Chelly Sandstone consists of sandstones of eolian deposits. The unit is broken into lower and upper members based on sediment transport directions.
- The Yeso Formation is divided into two members:
  - The Meseta Blanca Sandstone Member contains classic eolian deposits of cross-bedded, well-sorted sandstones. This formation may be equivalent to the De Chelly Sandstone.
  - The San Ysidro Member contains gypsiferous sandstones interbedded with limestones and reflects complex, cyclic facies changes (i.e. eolian, coastal, shallow shelf).
- The Glorieta Sandstone contains buff to white, silicious sandstones indicative of eolian deposits.
- The San Andres Limestone (aka, Bernal Formation) contains thick limestone and dolomite beds interbedded with sandstone or shale.

=== Mesozoic ===
==== Triassic ====
- The Moenkopi Formation and the upper Chinle Formation unconformably overlie Permian rocks and consist of continental sandstone, siltstone, and mudstone.

==== Jurassic ====
- Rocks of this time period, e.g. the Morrison Formation, contain continental sandstone and siltstone, and marine limestone and anhydrite deposits.

==== Cretaceous ====
The Cretaceous-aged units are the most well-understood and the most productive units in the San Juan Basin. The Inner Cretaceous Seaway's western extent was along the San Juan Basin, and the three major transgressive-regressive episodes that occurred during this time are recorded in the mid- to upper-Cretaceous stratigraphy.

- The Dakota Sandstone Formation is an early Cretaceous unit consists of fluvial sandstones deposited unconformably over older units. These units grade into the overlying Mancos Shale (see next line).
- The Mancos Shale represents deeper marine deposits as the Inner Cretaceous Seaway made its first major transgression. This formation is divided into three main members:
  - The Graneros Shale contains sandstone, bentonite, and limestone beds.
  - Then Greenhorn Limestone contains alternating beds of limestone and calcareous shale deposited during a time of maximum transgression.
  - The Juana Lopez Member contains fossil-rich calcareous shale beds.
- The Mesaverde Group was deposited as the Inner Cretaceous Seaway regressed to the northeast, depositing the Point Lookout Sandstone, and then transgressed to the southwest again, depositing the Cliff House Sandstone.
- The Lewis Shale contains grey shales interbedded with sandstone and limestone. These are deeper marine deposits as the seaway continued to regress to the southwest. This unit represents the westernmost extent of the Inner Cretaceous Seaway.
- The Pictured Cliffs Sandstone is divided into two layers: the lower unit contains interbedded Lewis-like shales and sandstones as the seaway began to regress, and the upper unit contains massive sandstone beds as the seaway made its final regression.
- The Fruitland Formation consists of shale, siltstone, and (most importantly) coal deposited from swamps, rivers, lakes, and flood plains.
- The Kirtland Formation is divided into two layers: the lower unit consists of shale very similar to the upper Fruitland, but is absent of coal beds (and thus, separated from the Fruitland), and the upper shale to sandstone units deposited by aggrading stream channels.

=== Cenozoic ===
- The Ojo Alamo Formation consists of arkosic conglomerates and sandstones most likely sourced from the west (noted by an eastward decrease in pebble size) that unconformably overlies older units.
- The Animas Formation of the north gradually grades into the Nacimiento Formation of the south. The units are volcanic in origin, sourced from the San Juan Volcanic Field, and contain conglomerates and andesite clasts.
- The Eocene-aged San Jose Formation consists of arkosic sandstones and shales.

== Hydrocarbon plays ==
The San Juan Basin contains ample fuel resources, including oil, gas, coal, and uranium. The basin has produced from over 300 oil fields and nearly 40,000 wells, most of which are sourced from Cretaceous-aged rocks. Furthermore, 90% of the wells have been drilled in the state of New Mexico. As of 2009, cumulative production reached 42.6 trillion cubic feet of gas and 381 million barrels of oil.

=== History ===
The first documented oil play in the San Juan Basin occurred in 1911 on the Chaco Slope. The well was drilled to a depth of 100 m and produced only 12 barrels of oil per day. The first documented gas play occurred ten years later in the Central Basin Platform. The well was 300 m deep and resulted in a gas pipeline to carry and market gas to nearby cities. The following years resulted in many oil and gas discoveries that subsequently spiked interest in San Juan resources. The 1930s brought upon the first pipeline to transport gas outside of the basin. The 1980s brought upon the discovery of the coal-bed methane resources, resulting in a drilling spike during the 1980s and 1990s. Production has since leveled out, but the basin is still actively producing today.

=== Paleozoic fields ===
While the majority of production has occurred in Cretaceous-aged units, the Paleozoic rocks of the Four Corners Platform have successfully produced from over two-dozen fields from Devonian, Mississippian, and Pennsylvanian-aged units. The Paleozoic units deepen in a northeast direction where they cross from the oil- to the gas-window; subsequently, Paleozoic fields yield gas in the northeast and oil in the southwest. Furthermore, Paleozoic field locations roughly align with the northeast-trending Hogback monocline. Future Paleozoic plays will target natural gas, and these will include untested carbonates in the Central Basin Platform and potentially undiscovered plays in the Four Corners Platform.

=== Mesozoic fields ===
Cretaceous-aged units account for the majority of gas and oil production in the San Juan Basin, i.e. nearly 250 of the >300 fields source Upper Cretaceous units. Major oil plays in the San Juan Basin target the Dakota Sandstone, the Gallup Sandstone, the Tocito Sandstone, and the El Vado Sandstone Member. The source rock for these units was the black, organic-rich marine shale of the stratigraphically lower Mancos Formation. Most of the oil fields described below are at or nearing depletion. Major gas plays in the San Juan Basin target the Dakota Sandstone, the Point Lookout Sandstone, and the Pictured Cliffs Sandstone. Plays consist of stratigraphic traps mostly concentrated in the Central Basin Platform.

==== Oil plays ====
- The Dakota Sandstone has nearly 40 oil fields throughout the Four Corners and Central Basin platforms, each having produced millions of barrels of oil.
- The Gallup Sandstone has about four oil fields on the Chaco Slope. Sandstones units have yielded tens of thousands to millions of barrels of oil.
- The Tocito Sandstone Lentil of the Mancos Shale has about 30 fields throughout the Four Corners and Central Basin platforms. The Tocito beds are the best Cretaceous reservoirs, having produced over 150 MBO (million barrels of oil) from a variety of structural and stratigraphic traps.
- The El Vado Sandstone Member of the Mancos Shale has produced from over nearly 40 fields mostly concentrated in the Central Basin Platform. This member alone has produced over 40 MBO.

==== Gas plays ====
- The Dakota Sandstone stores gas in offshore marine sandstones trapped by marine shales. Fracturing is required to source these units.
- The Pictured Cliffs Sandstone consists of regressive-marine deposits, where gas is stored in porous sandstones and trapped by mud- or siltstones. Production depends on natural fractures throughout unit.
- The Point Lookout Sandstone (see the Pictured Cliffs Sandstone above).

==== Coal-bed methane plays ====
- The Fruitland Formation encompasses the San Juan Basin's gracious supply of methane-rich coal beds. Methane is found within thousands of coal beds throughout the Fruitland Formation. Similar to Paleozoic gas fields, there is a trend of increasing gas content (and thermal maturity) in a northeast direction. Cumulative production (2009) is 15.7 trillion cubic feet of gas, making this the largest coal-bed methane field in the world.

== Methane cloud ==
In 2014 NASA researchers reported the discovery of a 2,500 square miles (6,500 km^{2}) methane cloud floating over the Basin. The discovery was based on data from the European Space Agency’s Scanning Imaging Absorption Spectrometer for Atmospheric Chartography instrument from 2002 to 2012.

The report concluded that "the source is likely from established gas, coal, and coalbed methane mining and processing." The region emitted 590,000 metric tons of methane every year between 2002 and 2012—almost 3.5 times the widely used estimates in the European Union’s Emissions Database for Global Atmospheric Research.
