= Grant meteorite =

Meteorite found in the United States

Grant
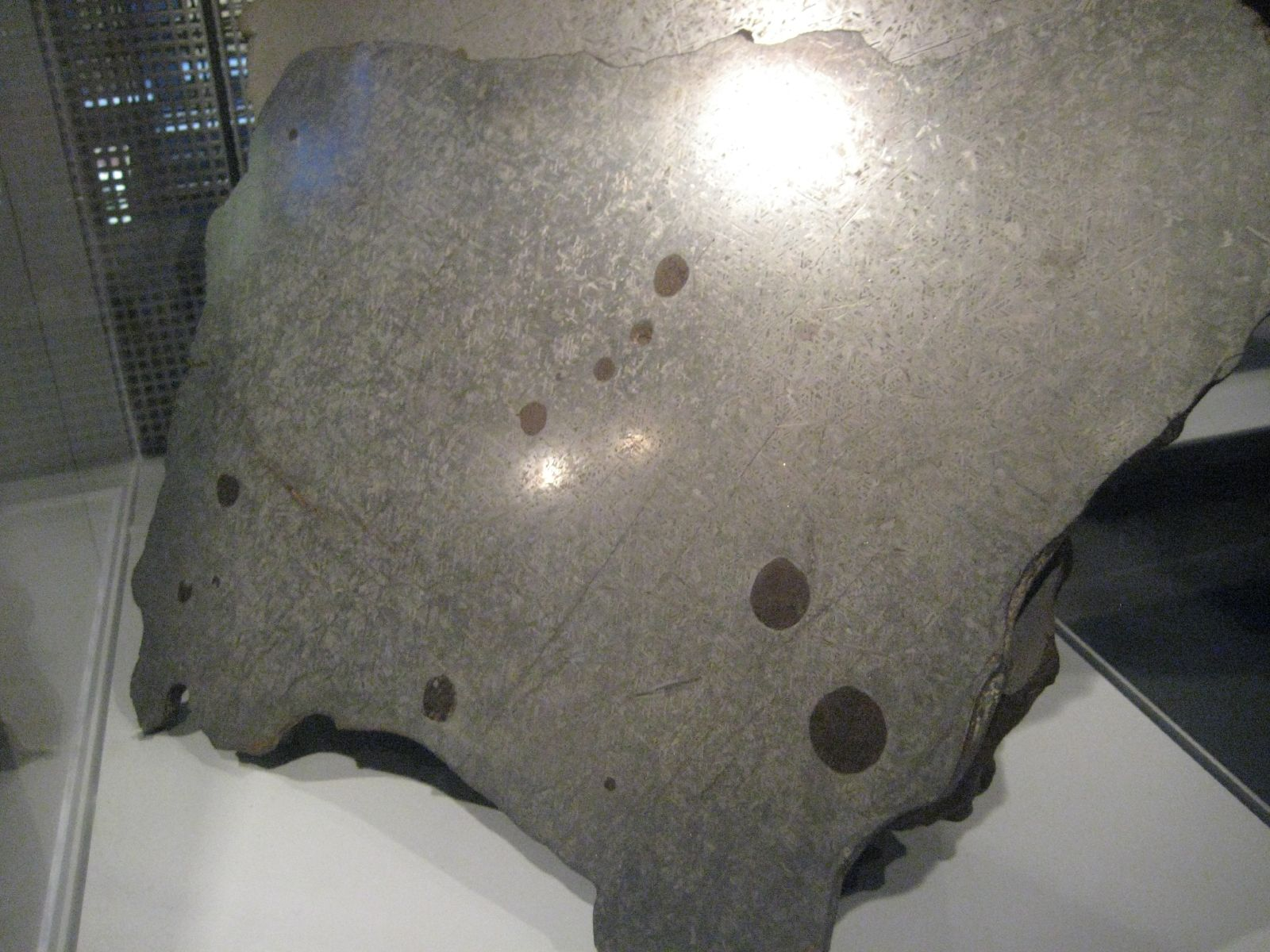
- Grant meteorite
- Type: Iron
- Country: United States
- Region: Zuni Mountains, New Mexico
- Observed fall: No
- Found date: 1929
- TKW: 1,060 pounds (480 kg)
- Related media on Wikimedia Commons

The Grant Meteorite is a meteorite that was discovered in the Zuni Mountains, about 45 miles (72 km) south of Grants, New Mexico (for which it was named). It was unearthed in 1929 although the date of its original groundfall is unknown.

The meteorite is a roughly conical mass of iron about 21.875 inches (55.56 cm) in height, and 22.875 to 29.375 inches (58.10 to 74.61 cm) in base dimension, weighing 1,060 pounds (480 kg). After discovery, the meteorite was sold to the Smithsonian Institution. It has since been used in a wide variety of scientific studies.

== See also ==
- Glossary of meteoritics
