= Mount Sedgwick =

Mount Sedgwick may refer to:

- Mount Sedgwick (British Columbia)
- Mount Sedgwick (New Mexico)
- Mount Sedgwick (Tasmania)
