= Zuni Mountain Stupa =

Tibetan Buddhist temple and stupa in Grants, New Mexico, US

Religion
- Affiliation: Nyingma

Location
- Location: 2062 Zuni Canyon Rd. Grants, New Mexico
- Country: United States
- Interactive map of Zuni Mountain Stupa
- Coordinates: 35.0507557761767°N 108.07163107919783°W

Architecture
- Completed: 2009

Website
- vairotsananm.org

Zuni Mountain Stupa is a Tibetan Buddhist temple of the Nyingma school in the Zuni Mountains in Grants, New Mexico, consecrated in 2009. A library of Buddhist texts from the Tengyur and the Kangyur is stored in the dome.

== History ==
Bhakha Rinpoche came to the United States in the 1980s. He has been teaching at the Zuni Mountain land since 1989. The temple was established by Bhakha Rinpoche and his organization, the Vairotsana Foundation. The Vairotsana Foundation is headquartered in Tularosa, New Mexico, the Orgyen Choling Tibetan Buddhist Center.

Construction on the temple started in 2004 and was completed in 2009. The temple was consecrated September 5–6, 2009. The complex also includes a cooking house and a prayer wheel house, built in 2001.

== Construction ==
The temple stupa is built in the style known as Duddul Chodten, a style which honors the Buddha's dispelling of negative forces. The dome, called a bumpa, is modeled on that of Boudhanath in Nepal. Construction took five years.

== See also ==
- Buddhism in the United States
- List of Buddhist temples
