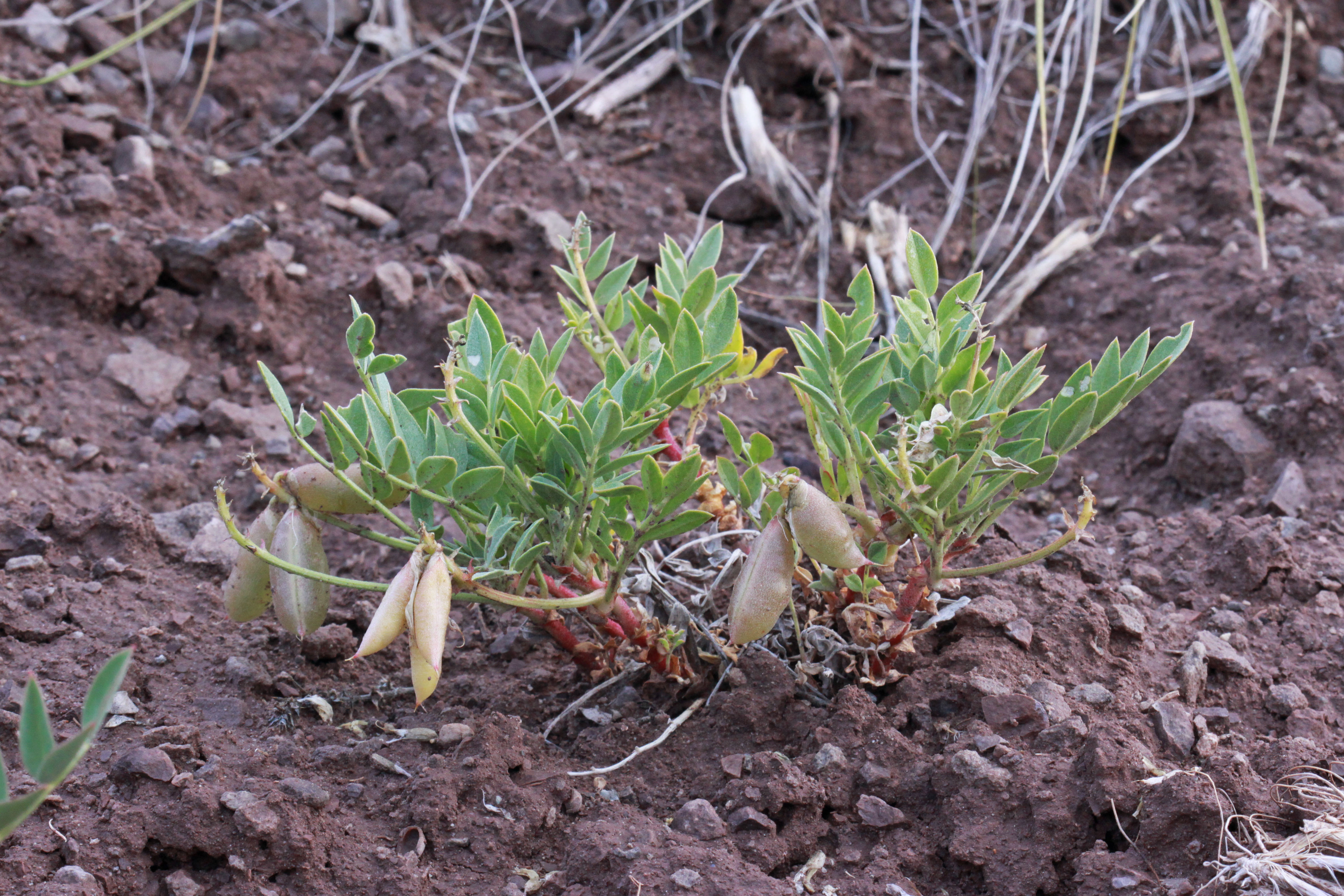

Conservation status
- Critically Imperiled (NatureServe)

Scientific classification
- Kingdom: Plantae
- Clade: Embryophytes
- Clade: Tracheophytes
- Clade: Angiosperms
- Clade: Eudicots
- Clade: Rosids
- Order: Fabales
- Family: Fabaceae
- Subfamily: Faboideae
- Genus: Astragalus
- Species: A. iselyi

Binomial name
- Astragalus iselyi S.L.Welsh

= Astragalus iselyi =

Species of legume

Astragalus iselyi is a rare species of flowering plant in the legume family known by the common name Isely's milkvetch. It is endemic to Utah in the United States.

This perennial herb grows up to 25 centimeters tall. It produces yellowish white flowers nearly 2 centimeters long. The fruit is an inflated, rough-haired legume pod up to 3.8 centimeters long.

This plant occurs in three areas in southeastern Utah, two in San Juan County and one in Grand County. It is limited to soils originating from the Morrison and Mancos Formations, and possibly the Paradox Formation. The soils are clay rich in selenium, gypsum, and uranium. Threats to the species include uranium mining in its habitat.
