= Aviation Heritage Museum =

Aviation Heritage Museum can refer to any of several museums including:

- Alaska Aviation Heritage Museum
- Aviation Heritage Museum (Western Australia)
- Western New Mexico Aviation Heritage Museum
