= Hermosa Group =

Geologic formations in Utah and Colorado

- Stratigraphic range: Carboniferous
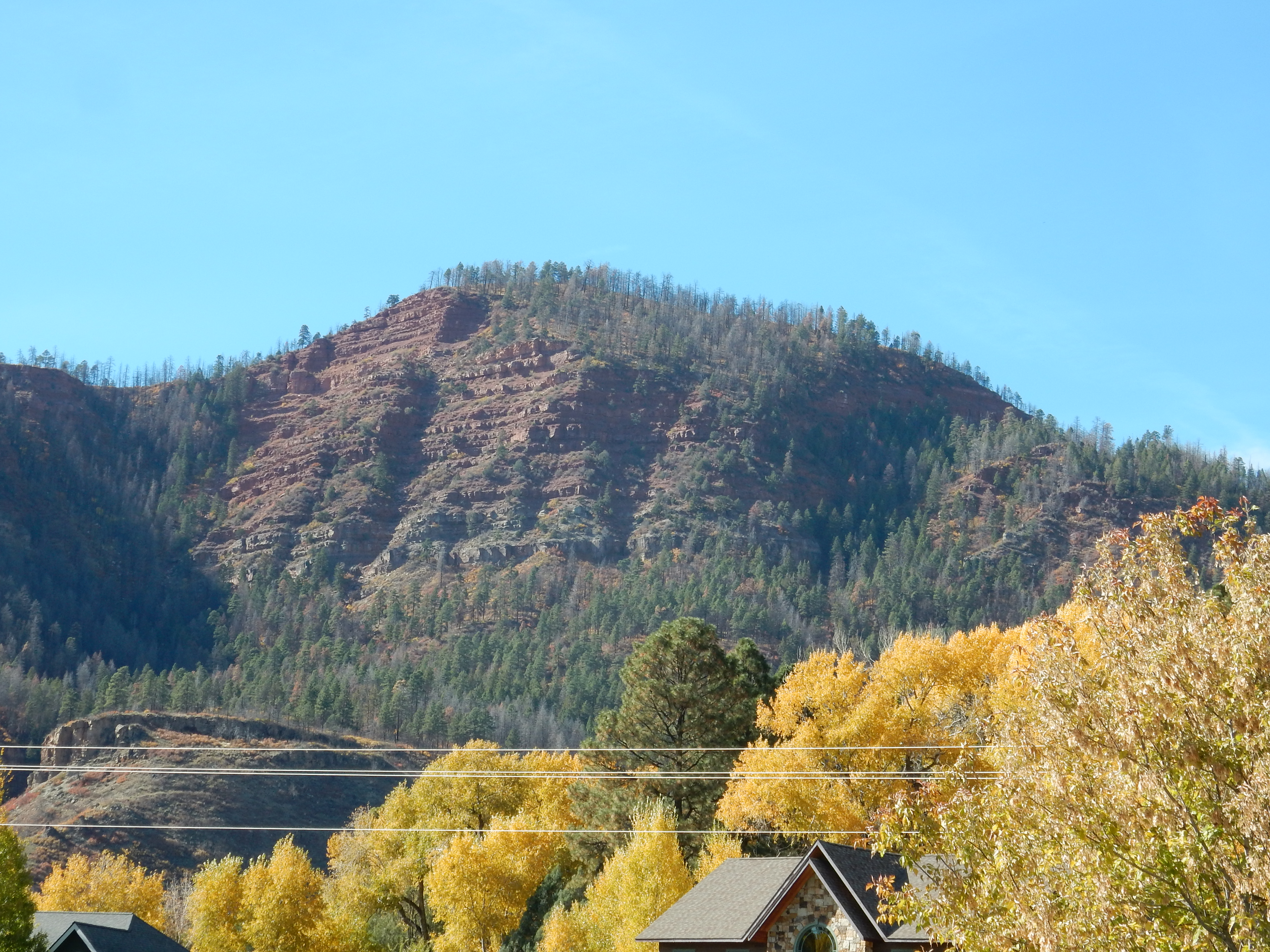
- Hermosa Formation near its type section, Hermosa, Colorado, US
- Type: Group
- Sub-units: Honaker Trail Formation; Paradox Formation; Pinkerton Trail Formation
- Underlies: Cutler Group
- Overlies: Molas Formation

Lithology
- Primary: mudstone
- Other: shale, limestone

Location
- Coordinates: 37.431°N 107.837°W
- Region: Utah
- Country: United States

Type section
- Named for: Hermosa Creek
- Named by: Cross and Spencer
- Year defined: 1899

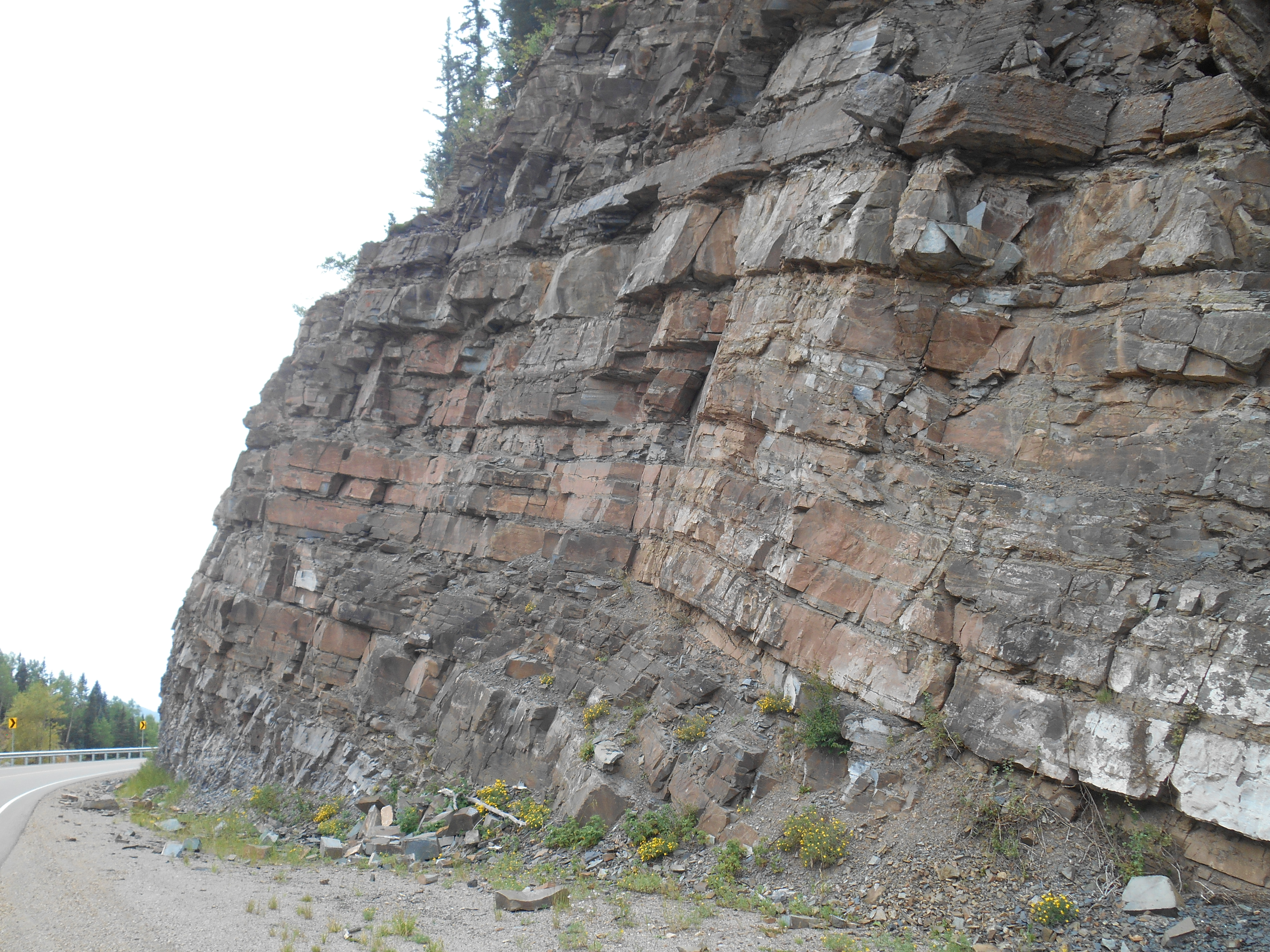
Hermosa Formation exposed in a roadcut near Rico, Colorado.

The Hermosa Group is a group of geologic formations in Utah and Colorado. It preserves fossils dating back to the Carboniferous period.

== See also ==
- List of fossiliferous stratigraphic units in Utah
- Paleontology in Utah
