= Paradox Formation =

Geologic formation in the United States

- Stratigraphic range: Pennsylvanian 313–304 Ma
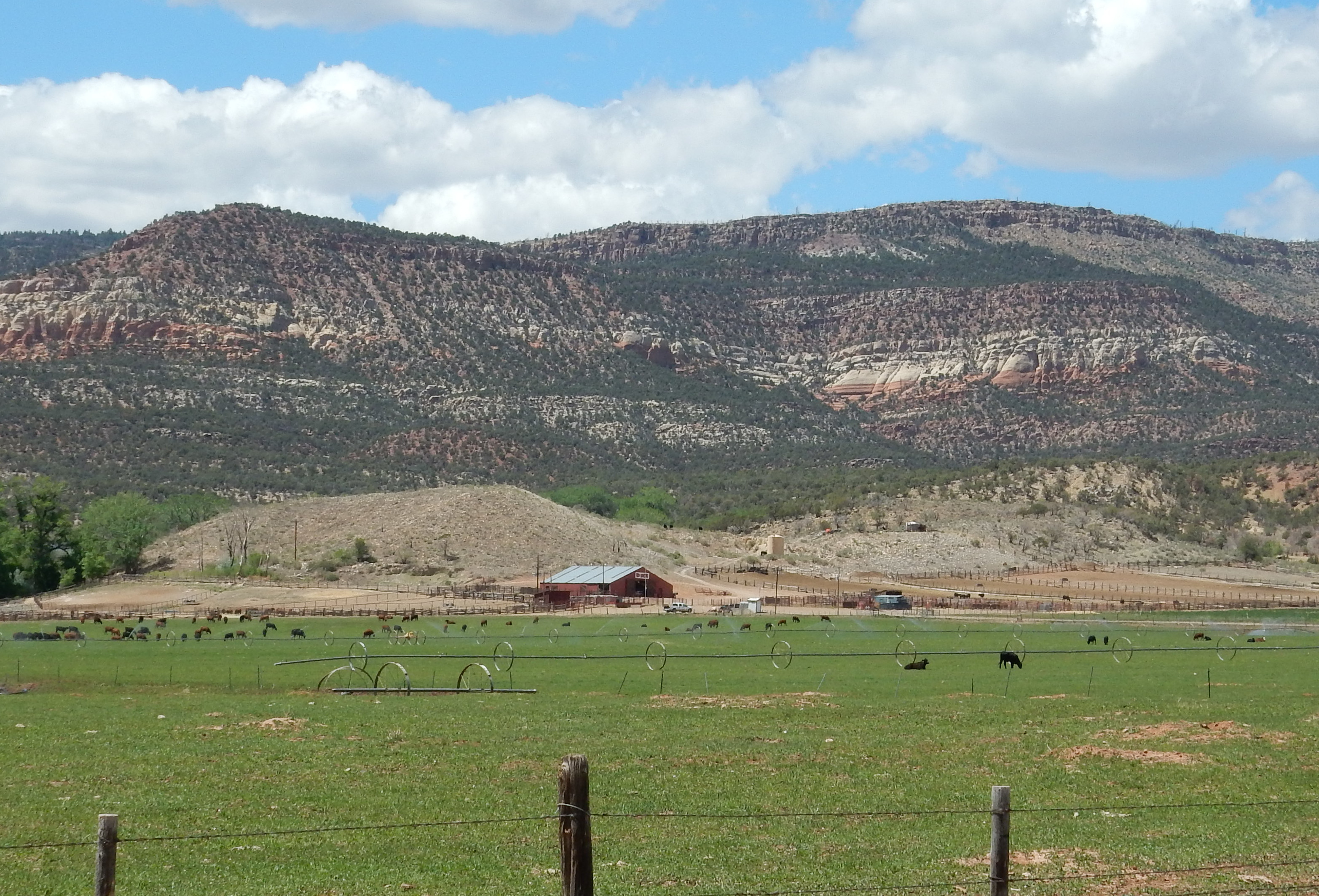
- Paradox Formation at its type location at Paradox, Colorado
- Type: Geological formation
- Unit of: Hermosa Group
- Underlies: Honaker Trail Formation
- Overlies: Pinkerton Trail Formation
- Thickness: 4,380 feet (1,340 m)

Lithology
- Primary: evaporites
- Other: sandstone, shale, limestone

Location
- Coordinates: 38.368°N 108.964°W
- Region: Utah, Colorado
- Country: United States
- Extent: 150 by 80 miles (240 by 130 km) (evaporite facies)

Type section
- Named for: Paradox Valley
- Named by: Baker, Dante, and Reeside
- Year defined: 1933
- Paradox Formation (the United States) Paradox Formation (Colorado)

In geology, the Paradox Formation Is a Pennsylvanian age formation which consists of abundant evaporites with lesser interbedded shale, sandstone, and limestone. The evaporites are largely composed of gypsum, anhydrite, and halite. The formation is found mostly in the subsurface, but there are scattered exposures in anticlines in eastern Utah and western Colorado. These surface exposures occur in the Black Mesa, San Juan and Paradox Basins and the formation is found in the subsurface in southwestern Colorado, southeastern Utah, northeastern Arizona and northeastern New Mexico.

The formation is notable both for its petroleum resources and for its salt tectonics, which are responsible for many distinctive geologic features of the eastern Colorado Plateau. In addition to the anticline valleys, these include the grabens of the Needles District of Canyonlands National Park and the fins and arches of Arches National Park.

== Description ==
The Paradox Formation was deposited in the Paradox Basin, a deep basin formed southwest of the Uncompahgre uplift of the Ancestral Rocky Mountains. The basin experienced rapid subsidence at the same time that sea levels were periodically rising and falling as a result of late Paleozoic glaciation. This produced periodic flooding of the basin (as sea levels rose) followed by evaporation (as sea levels fell.) Some 33 cycles of sea level rise and fall are recorded in the Paradox basin, each producing a characteristic sequence of mineral beds. As sea level rose, anhydrite or gypsum were deposited, followed by dolomite, then black shale at the high stand of the sea. As sea level dropped and the basin was cut off from the open ocean, dolomite was again deposited, then gypsum or anhydrite, then halite (which makes up most of the thickness of the cycle), then potash. Each cycle is separated by an erosional surface marking the low stand of the sea, and in some cases the potash beds were completely eroded away, so that they are not present in all cycles. This evaporite facies of the formation exists mainly in the subsurface, with only scattered surface exposures of highly deformed beds of the less soluble minerals.

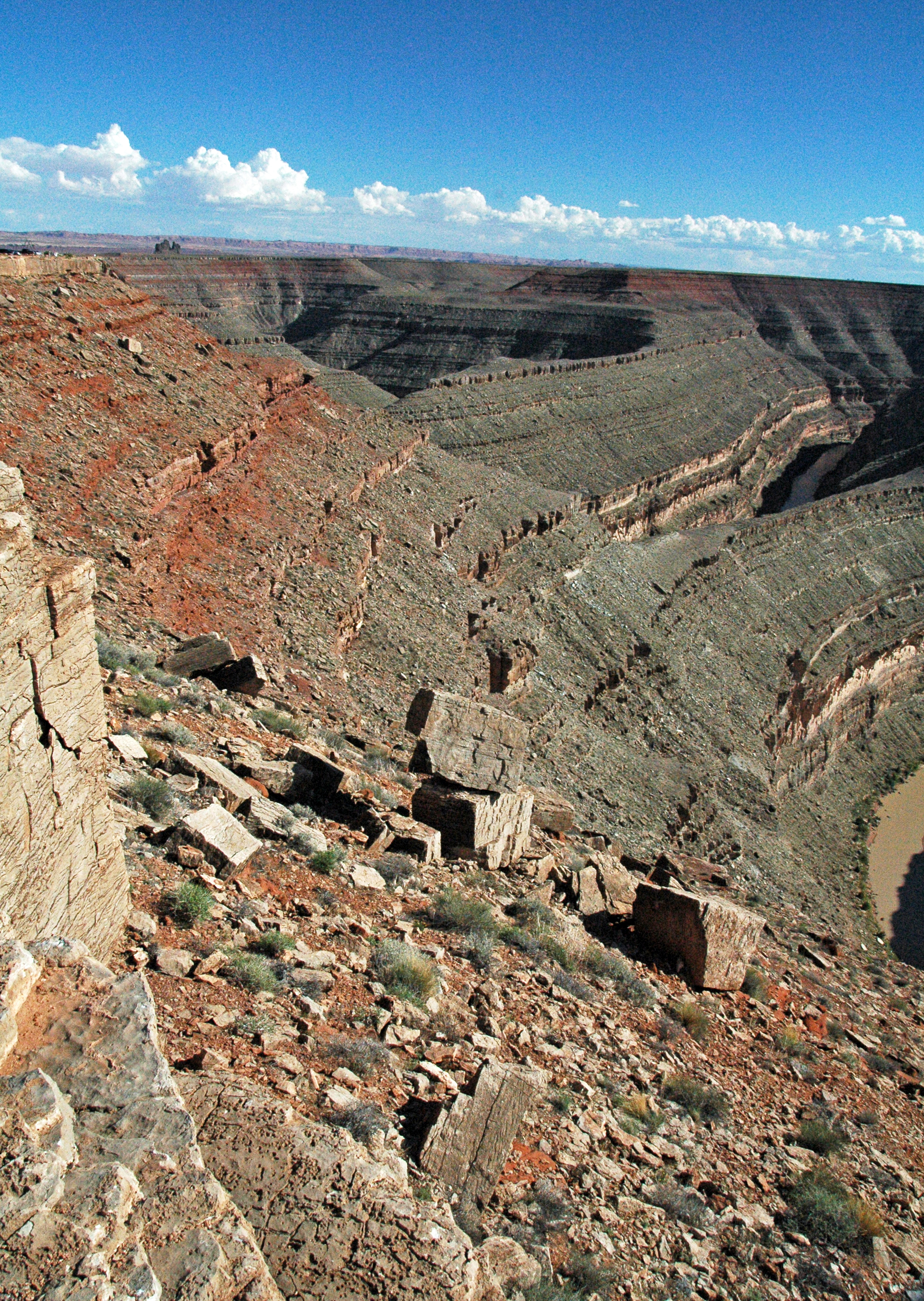
Honaker Trail Formation over the shelf facies of the Paradox Formation in the San Juan River canyon

To the northeast, near the Uncompahgre uplift, the Paradox Formation abruptly transitions to clastic rock assigned to the undivided Hermosa Group. To the southwest, the basin gradually shallows, and the evaporite beds are replaced by limestone of the carbonate shelf facies of the Paradox Formation. Here each cycle consists of black shale, then carbonate mudstone, then highly fossiliferous silty limestone, then algal mounds, ending with a cap facies of sediments deposited in a very shallow, high-energy environment. This is separated by an erosional surface from the base of the next cycle. The algal mounds are dominated by Ivanovia, a green alga whose calcareous fronds form an excellent reservoir rock for petroleum. The carbonate shelf facies is less than 1,000 feet (300 m) thick but is exposed in the bottom of the San Juan River canyon.

The formation is assigned to the Hermosa Group, of which it is the middle formation. It overlies the Pinkerton Trail Formation and is in turn overlain by the Honaker Trail Formation. Both contacts are conformable.

== Salt tectonics ==
The Paradox Formation is a source of petroleum, with oil fields at Aneth, Desert Creek, North Desert Creek, Squaw Canyon, Bluff, and Dove Creek, among other locations. However, its greatest significance may be through the unusual salt tectonics it causes across the eastern Colorado Plateau. The most striking of these are the salt anticlines. Halite (rock salt) is relatively low in density (with a specific gravity around 2.17) and is ductile, slowly deforming under pressure. The relatively light salt tend to rise towards the surface as salt walls, deforming the overlying beds into anticlines. When a salt wall approaches the surface, it is dissolved and removed by groundwater, causing the center of the anticline to collapse and form a salt anticline valley. Examples of salt anticline valleys arising from the Paradox Formation include Spanish Valley, Lisbon Valley, Paradox Valley, and Gypsum Valley. Further west, the salt walls are located at greater depth, and the salt anticlines have not collapsed and are identifiable only by geological mapping.

Another feature produced by salt tectonics is the Needles District fault zone in Canyonlands National Park. Here the Colorado River has breached the salt beds of the Paradox Formation in Cataract Canyon, dissolving great quantities of salt and causing the overlying beds on either side of the canyon to slump towards the river. This produces the striking arcuate faults and associated grabens of the Needles District.

The deformation of overlying beds, due to deformation from the movement of underlying salt, is also responsible for the distinctive features of Arches National Park. The deformation of the beds resulted in the development of extensive parallel fractures in the sandstone of the Entrada Formation, and erosion along the fractures produced the fins and arches seen in the park.

== History of investigation ==
The formation was named by A.A. Baker, C.H. Dane, and John B. Reeside, Jr. in 1933 for exposures in the Paradox Valley, found particularly around the town of Paradox, Colorado. Geologists had already noticed the beds of gypsum found in a few exposures in the Paradox Valley and neighboring valleys, and indications of petroleum, natural gas, and potash had been found in wells penetrating these beds. However, the beds lacked age-determinative fossils and were highly deformed, making it difficult to determine their relationship to other formations. Baker, Dane, and Reeside examined well logs from throughout the region and concluded that the evaporite beds filled a subsurface basin some 150 by 80 miles (240 by 130 km) in extent trending northwest to southeast. The beds averaged about 2,000 feet (610 m) thick, though thickness varied greatly due to ductile movement of the evaporites. They also found fossils in well cores that indicated an early Pennsylvanian age for the formation, and concluded that the Paradox beds underlay the Hermosa Formation as then defined. Because surface exposures were few and poor, they described a section for the formation from a well drilled at Schafer dome, about 10 miles southwest of Moab, Utah.

By 1957, the Paradox was recognized as an important petroleum-bearing unit. The next year, Sherman A. Wengerd and Marvin L. Matheny established the stratigraphic framework for the Pennsylvanian formations of the Four Corners region that is now in wide use, with the Hermosa Group consisting of a lower Pinkerton Trail Formation, the middle Paradox Formation, and an upper Honaker Trail Formation.

In 1967, Don L. Baars, J. William Parker, and John Chronic further refined the definition of the Paradox Formation, establishing its age as Atokan to Missourian, and defining a subsurface reference section at depths of 5,420 to 9,600 feet (1,650 to 2,930 m) at a well northeast of Egnar, Colorado. Here the original evaporite beds show little indication of deformation.
