= Uncompahgre Gorge =

Canyon in Ouray County, Colorado

Coordinates: 38°01′08″N 107°40′35″W

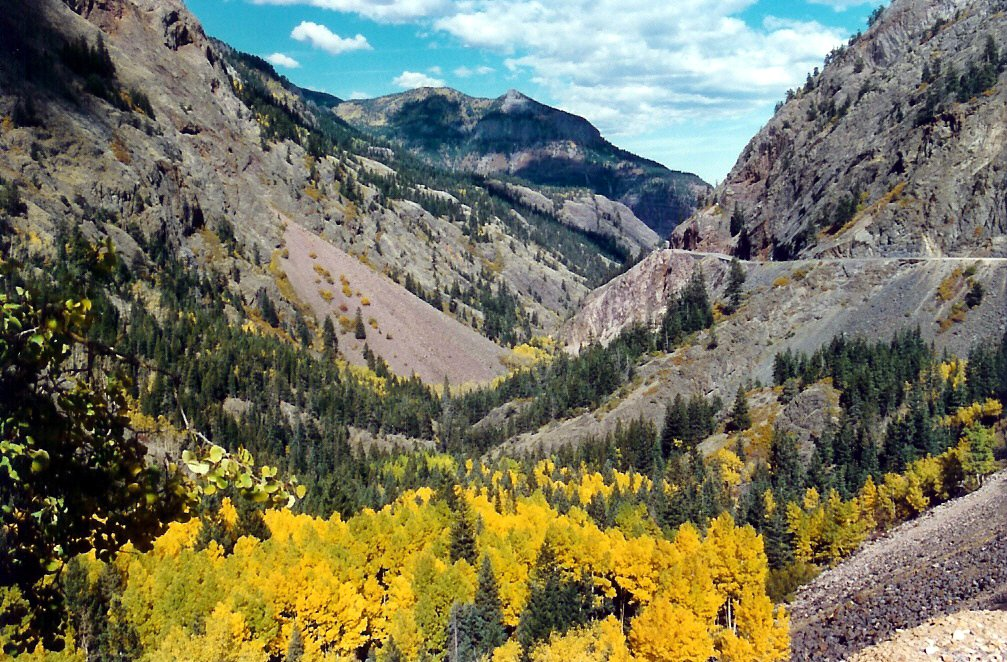
Uncompahgre Gorge in autumn

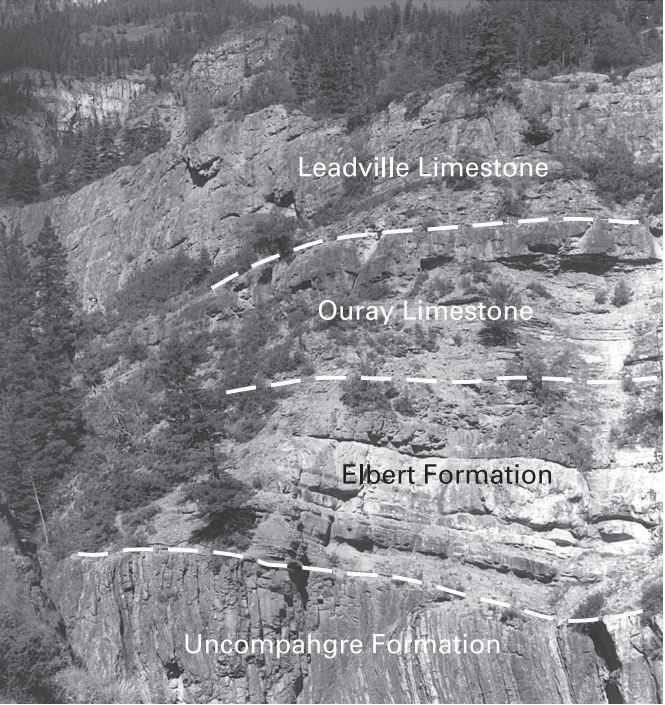
Uncompahgre outcrop in the gorge with key geological formations, including the Ouray Formation, Elbert Formation, and the Leadville Limestone

The Uncompahgre Gorge is a deep mountain canyon formed by the Uncompahgre River and Red Mountain Creek in the Uncompahgre National Forest. It is located just south of Ouray, in Ouray County, Colorado.

At the north end of the Gorge the Uncompahgre River flows into a deep box canyon which is home to Ouray Ice Park.

Access to the gorge is via U.S. Highway 550 along the Million Dollar Highway which is cut through the steep cliffs high above the river.

Several waterfalls fall into the canyon, including Bear Creek Falls, right under a bridge on Highway 550 about 3 miles (5 km) south of Ouray.
