= Grants, New Mexico =

- City
- Nickname: Uranium Capital of the World
- Motto: "City of Spirit"
- Location of Grants, New Mexico

- Location in the United States
- Coordinates: 35°08′50″N 107°51′05″W
- Country: United States
- State: New Mexico
- County: Cibola
- Founded: 1872 (as Los Alamitos)
- Founded by: Don Jesus Blea
- Named after: Canadian brothers Angus, Lewis and John Grant (as Grants)

Government
  - Mayor: Erik Garcia

Area
  - Total: 14.91 sq mi (38.62 km^{2})
  - Land: 14.91 sq mi (38.62 km^{2})
  - Water: 0 sq mi (0.00 km^{2})
- Elevation: 6,454 ft (1,967 m)

Population (2020)
  - Total: 9,163
  - Density: 614.4/sq mi (237.24/km^{2})
- Time zone: UTC−7 (Mountain (MST))
  - Summer (DST): UTC−6 (MDT)
- ZIP code: 87020
- Area code: 505
- FIPS code: 35-30490
- GNIS feature ID: 2410646
- Website: www.grantsnm.gov

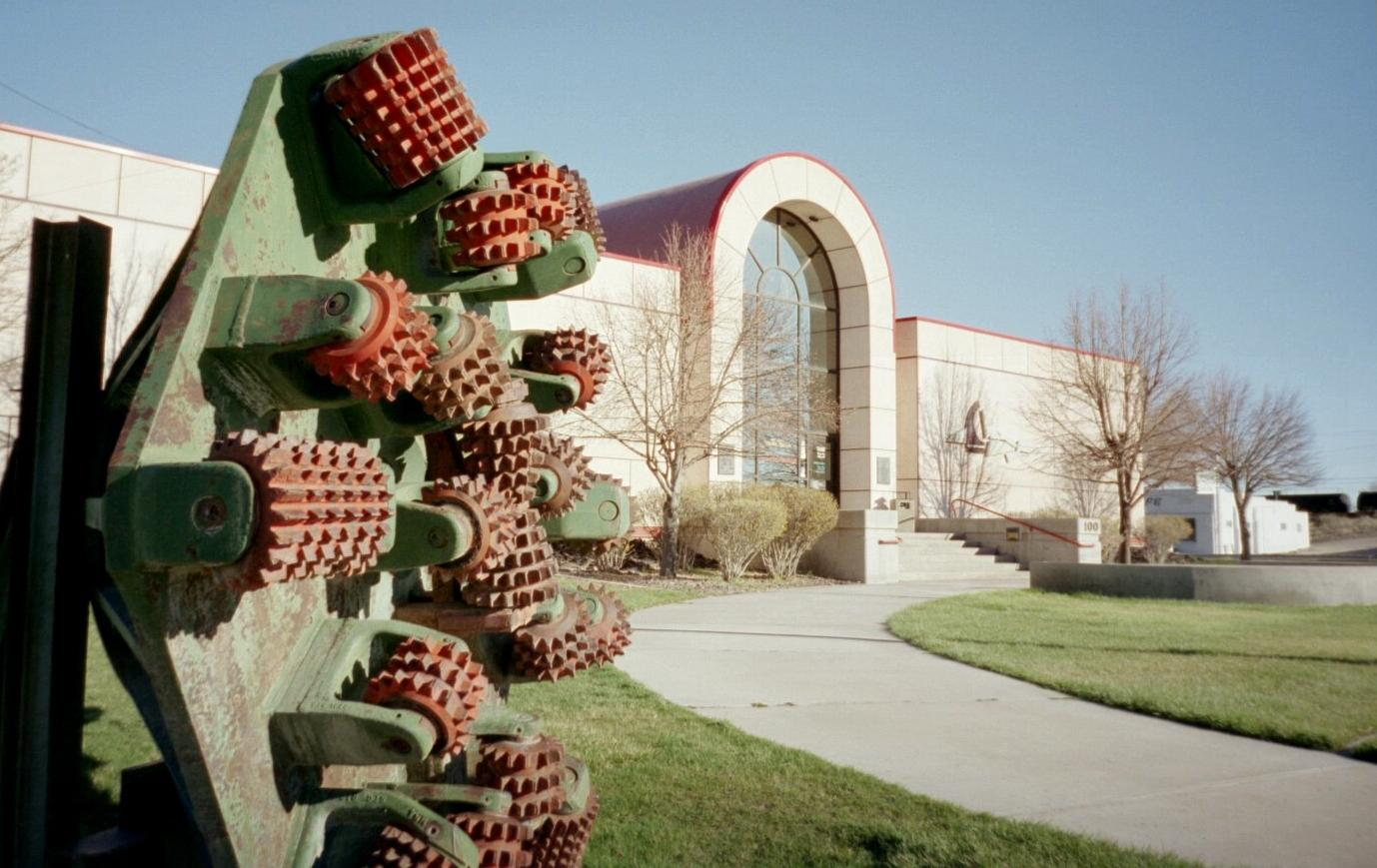
The New Mexico Mining Museum, next to Historic Route 66

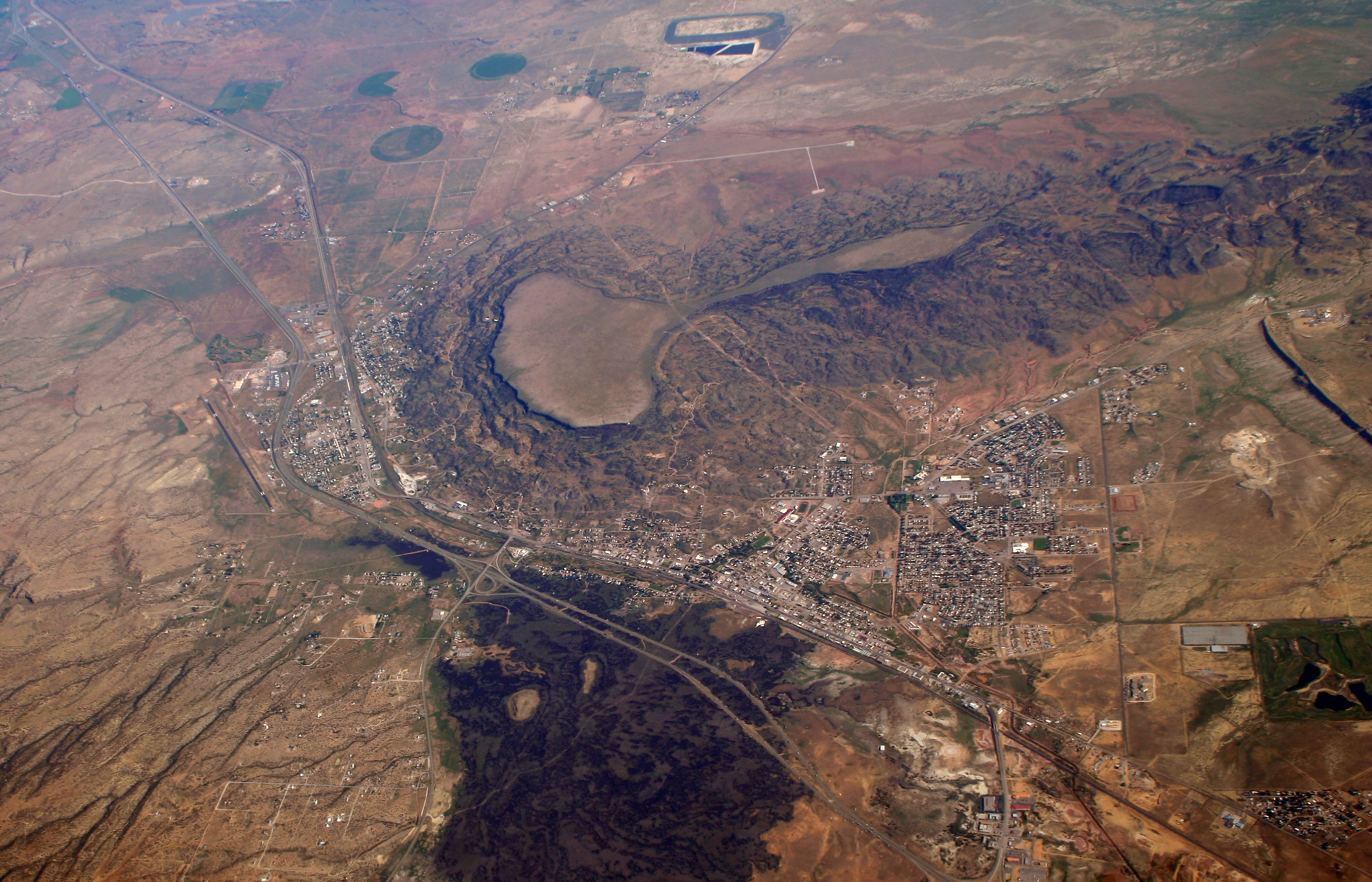
Aerial view of Grants in 2007. Black Mesa is above town, and to the west Grants adjoins Milan. Interstate 40 bends to avoid the mesa.

Grants is a city in Cibola County, New Mexico, United States. It is located about 78 miles (126 km) west of Albuquerque. The population was 9,163 at the 2020 Census. It is the county seat of Cibola County.

Grants is located on Historic Route 66, and along the Trails of the Ancients Byway, one of the designated New Mexico Scenic Byways.

== History ==
Grants began as a railroad camp in the 1880s, when three Canadian brothers – Angus A. Grant, John R. Grant, and Lewis A. Grant – were awarded a contract to build a section of the Atlantic and Pacific Railroad through the region. The Grant brothers' camp was first called Grants Camp, then Grants Station, and finally Grants. The new city enveloped the existing colonial New Mexican settlement of Los Alamitos and grew along the tracks of the Atlantic and Pacific Railroad.

The town prospered from railroad logging in the nearby Zuni Mountains, and it was a section point for the Atlantic and Pacific, which became part of the Atchison, Topeka and Santa Fe Railway. The Zuni Mountain Railroad short line had a roundhouse in town (near Exit 81 off Interstate 40) and housed workers in a small community named Breecetown. Timber from the Zuni Mountains was shipped to Albuquerque, where a large sawmill converted the timber to wood products that were sold across the west.

After the decline of logging in the 1930s, Grants-Milan gained fame as the "carrot capital" of the United States. Agriculture was aided by the creation of Bluewater Reservoir, and the region's volcanic soils provided ideal conditions for farming. Grants also benefited from its location as airway beacon and later by U.S Route 66 (US 66), which brought travelers and tourists, and the businesses that catered to them. As of 2013 the beacon and FSS building on the airport (KGNT) was being restored as the Western New Mexico Aviation Heritage Museum.

Perhaps the town's most memorable boom occurred when Paddy Martinez, a Navajo shepherd, discovered uranium ore near Haystack Mesa, sparking a mining boom that lasted until the 1980s (see Uranium mining in New Mexico). The collapse of mining pulled the town into a depression, but the town has enjoyed a resurgence based on interest in tourism and the scenic beauty of the region. Recent interest in nuclear power has revived the possibility of more uranium mining in the area, and energy companies still own viable mining properties and claims in the area.

== Geography ==
Grants is located in north-central Cibola County. US Route 66 (formerly known as Santa Fe Ave) is the main road through the city, while Interstate 40 passes through the south side of the city, with access from exits 81 and 85. I-40 leads 78 miles (126 km) east to Albuquerque and west 61 miles (98 km) to Gallup. The town of Milan borders the northwest end of Grants.

According to the United States Census Bureau, the city has a total area of 14.9 square miles (38.5 km^{2}), all land. Grants is on the north end of the large and recent (youngest flows around 3,000 years old) lava field known as El Malpais ("the badlands"), part of which is preserved as El Malpais National Monument. To the northeast of town are the San Mateo Mountains and Mount Taylor, at 11,301 feet (3,445 m) the highest peak in the region. West of the city is the Continental Divide and the Zuni Mountains, an eroded anticline with 2-billion-year-old Precambrian granites and metamorphic rocks at its core. The region is primarily high desert country, dominated by sandstones and lava flows.

== Climate ==
Grants has a typical New Mexico cool semi-arid climate (Köppen BSk). Located in one of the driest areas in the United States, Grants receives about 11 inches or 280 millimetres of precipitation annually. The three wettest months are July, August and September, during the monsoon season. The wettest month on record has been July 2015 with 5.59 inches (142.0 mm), and the wettest day August 25, 1972 with 1.91 inches or 48.5 millimetres. The wettest calendar year since 1948 has been 1965 with 17.11 inches (434.6 mm) and the driest 1956 with 4.41 inches (112.0 mm). Even during the monsoon season, diurnal temperature ranges are very large, being at or above 35 °F or 19.4 °C almost year-round.

From October, when the monsoon retreats, afternoon temperatures fall from very warm to hot down to comfortable by November and to cool during the winter proper. Mornings typically begin to fall below freezing during October, and over a whole year 177.6 mornings will fall below freezing, although afternoon maxima top freezing on all bar 5.1 afternoons. 0 °F or −17.8 °C is typically reached on 4.6 mornings, and the coldest temperature on record is −33 °F or −36.1 °C on Christmas Day, 1990. The aridity of the winters makes snowfall very light: the median is only 0.5 inches or 0.013 metres and the most snow in one month 25.7 inches (0.65 m) in December 1967, which also saw the snowiest season with 39.6 inches (1.01 m).

During the spring, the weather steadily heats up, with maxima topping 70 °F (21.1 °C) before the end of April and reaching 90 °F or 32.2 °C on 35.6 afternoons – although only five mornings on record have stayed above 68 °F or 20.0 °C. During this early summer period, the weather remains very dry, so that mornings remain cool even into June – as late as June 23, 1964 the temperature fell to freezing. The hottest temperature on record has been 106 °F (41.1 °C) on July 14, 2003, and June 28, 2013.

Climate data for Grants-Milan Municipal Airport, New Mexico, 1991–2020 normals, extremes 1953–2017
Month	Jan	Feb	Mar	Apr	May	Jun	Jul	Aug	Sep	Oct	Nov	Dec	Year
Record high °F (°C)	71 (22)	75 (24)	83 (28)	90 (32)	99 (37)	106 (41)	106 (41)	102 (39)	96 (36)	90 (32)	80 (27)	71 (22)	106 (41)
Mean daily maximum °F (°C)	49.9 (9.9)	55.6 (13.1)	63.5 (17.5)	70.4 (21.3)	79.6 (26.4)	90.3 (32.4)	91.9 (33.3)	89.0 (31.7)	83.5 (28.6)	73.4 (23.0)	60.4 (15.8)	50.2 (10.1)	71.5 (21.9)
Daily mean °F (°C)	32.3 (0.2)	36.3 (2.4)	43.4 (6.3)	50.5 (10.3)	59.2 (15.1)	69.1 (20.6)	73.7 (23.2)	71.1 (21.7)	64.1 (17.8)	52.5 (11.4)	40.8 (4.9)	32.1 (0.1)	52.1 (11.2)
Mean daily minimum °F (°C)	14.6 (−9.7)	17.0 (−8.3)	23.4 (−4.8)	30.6 (−0.8)	38.9 (3.8)	47.9 (8.8)	55.4 (13.0)	53.2 (11.8)	44.8 (7.1)	31.6 (−0.2)	21.1 (−6.1)	14.1 (−9.9)	32.7 (0.4)
Record low °F (°C)	−31 (−35)	−18 (−28)	−3 (−19)	6 (−14)	15 (−9)	28 (−2)	37 (3)	34 (1)	20 (−7)	10 (−12)	−22 (−30)	−33 (−36)	−33 (−36)
Average precipitation inches (mm)	0.56 (14)	0.39 (9.9)	0.49 (12)	0.42 (11)	0.52 (13)	0.49 (12)	1.69 (43)	1.83 (46)	1.19 (30)	0.83 (21)	0.65 (17)	0.61 (15)	9.67 (243.9)
Average snowfall inches (cm)	2.2 (5.6)	1.2 (3.0)	0.5 (1.3)	0.3 (0.76)	0.0 (0.0)	0.0 (0.0)	0.0 (0.0)	0.0 (0.0)	0.0 (0.0)	0.3 (0.76)	0.6 (1.5)	2.8 (7.1)	7.9 (20.02)
Average precipitation days (≥ 0.01 in)	4.0	3.5	3.4	3.2	3.3	3.0	8.5	9.8	6.1	4.5	3.6	4.1	57.0
Average snowy days (≥ 0.1 in)	1.6	1.1	0.3	0.3	0.0	0.0	0.0	0.0	0.0	0.1	0.5	1.5	5.4
Source 1: NOAA
Source 2: xmACIS2

== Demographics ==
Historical population
Census	Pop.	Note	%±
1950	2,251		—
1960	10,274		356.4%
1970	8,768		−14.7%
1980	11,439		30.5%
1990	8,626		−24.6%
2000	8,806		2.1%
2010	9,182		4.3%
2020	9,163		−0.2%
U.S. Decennial Census

=== 2020 census ===
As of the 2020 census, Grants had a population of 9,163. The median age was 36.8 years. 25.0% of residents were under the age of 18 and 17.1% of residents were 65 years of age or older. For every 100 females there were 105.6 males, and for every 100 females age 18 and over there were 107.0 males age 18 and over.

84.7% of residents lived in urban areas, while 15.3% lived in rural areas.

There were 3,305 households in Grants, of which 33.1% had children under the age of 18 living in them. Of all households, 35.7% were married-couple households, 19.8% were households with a male householder and no spouse or partner present, and 34.2% were households with a female householder and no spouse or partner present. About 30.4% of all households were made up of individuals and 14.0% had someone living alone who was 65 years of age or older.

There were 3,868 housing units, of which 14.6% were vacant. The homeowner vacancy rate was 2.6% and the rental vacancy rate was 15.0%.

Racial composition as of the 2020 census
Race	Number	Percent
White	3,569	39.0%
Black or African American	149	1.6%
American Indian and Alaska Native	2,101	22.9%
Asian	163	1.8%
Native Hawaiian and Other Pacific Islander	8	0.1%
Some other race	1,455	15.9%
Two or more races	1,718	18.7%
Hispanic or Latino (of any race)	4,566	49.8%

=== 2000 census ===
As of the census of 2000, there were 8,806 people, 3,202 households, and 2,321 families residing in the city. The population density was 644.4 inhabitants per square mile (248.8/km^{2}). There were 3,626 housing units at an average density of 265.3 per square mile (102.4/km^{2}). The racial makeup of the city among Non-Hispanic groups was 56.18% White, 1.62% African American, 11.97% Native American, 0.92% Asian, 0.12% Pacific Islander, 24.80% from other races, and 4.38% from two or more races. Hispanic or Latino of any race were 52.36% of the population.

There were 3,202 households, out of which 37.5% had children under the age of 18 living with them, 49.5% were married couples living together, 17.1% had a female householder with no husband present, and 27.5% were non-families. 24.1% of all households were made up of individuals, and 8.5% had someone living alone who was 65 years of age or older. The average household size was 2.61 and the average family size was 3.06.

In the city, the population was spread out, with 28.8% under the age of 18, 9.3% from 18 to 24, 27.9% from 25 to 44, 21.7% from 45 to 64, and 12.3% who were 65 years of age or older. The median age was 34 years. For every 100 females, there were 85.3 males. For every 100 females age 18 and over, there were 79.4 males.

The median income for a household in the city was $30,652, and the median income for a family was $33,464. Males had a median income of $31,870 versus $20,808 for females. The per capita income for the city was $14,053. About 19.4% of families and 21.9% of the population were below the poverty line, including 31.8% of those under age 18 and 11.1% of those age 65 or over.

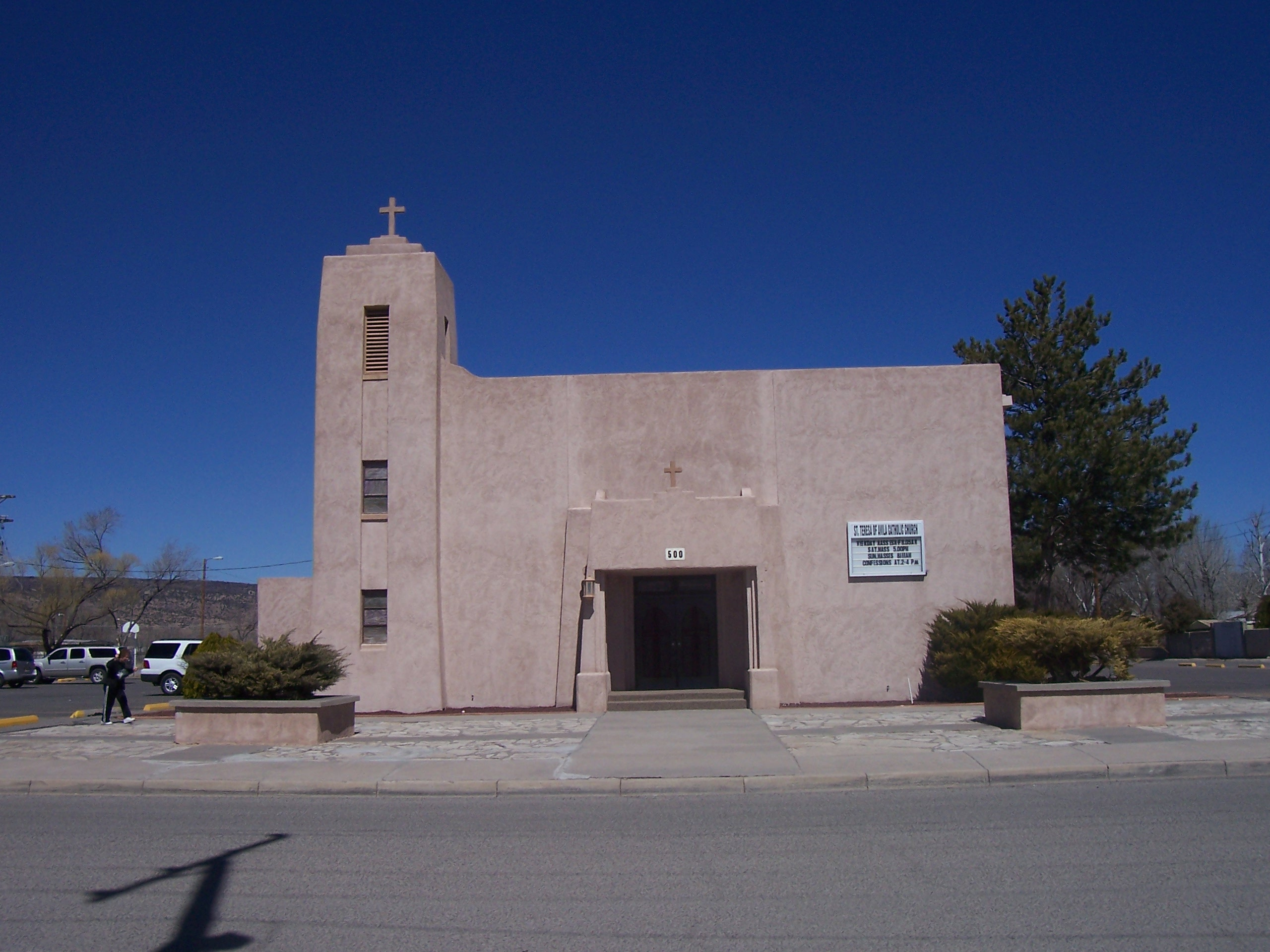
Grants' only Catholic church, St. Teresa

== Education ==
All public schools in the county are operated by Grants/Cibola County Schools. Seven elementary schools, one middle school and two high schools serve Grants and Cibola County. Los Alamitos Middle School and Grants High School serve Grants.

St. Teresa of Avila Catholic School, of the Roman Catholic Diocese of Gallup, is the only private accredited school in the city and serves grades pre-Kindergarten through eighth grades. The school building opened in 1945.

There is a branch of New Mexico State University offering a two-year postsecondary program as well as advanced degrees through distance education.

== Culture ==
The National Park Service and the Bureau of Land Management operate the El Malpais Visitor Center at Exit 85 off Interstate 40 in Grants. The visitor center highlights the many features of El Malpais National Monument and El Malpais National Conservation Area.

The New Mexico Mining Museum is located in downtown Grants, which is the only simulated Uranium mining museum in the world. It offers a two floors of exhibits, the first floor being free admission which discusses the history of mining in the area, and the second underground floor charging a small admission fee, which harbors the simulated uranium mine.

The Route 66 Drive-Thru Arch is located in Downtown Grants, and is a photo-opportunity for tourists to the area.

The Cibola County History Museum is next door to the Mining Museum, which is a museum that delves into the rich culture of Grants and the surrounding areas.

Aviation enthusiasts might be surprised by the Western New Mexico Airways Heritage Museum . It is located at the Grants-Milan Municipal Airport, and is open Saturday mornings only.

On Route 66, the Cibola Arts Council runs an art gallery and museum that features the works of local artists and many Route 66 artifacts. The gallery hosts special events, shows, and openings on a regular basis.

There is a Tibetan Buddhist stupa in the Zuni Mountains west of town, the Zuni Mountain Stupa.

== Communications ==
=== Radio ===
- KDSK-FM (92.7 MHz)
- KSFE (FM) (96.7 MHz)
- KMIN (980 kHz)

=== Television ===
- KOB-TV (4) (NBC affiliate)
- KOAT (7) (ABC affiliate)
- 7 Cities (10)
- KRQE (13) (CBS affiliate)

=== Print ===
- Cibola Citizen (formerly Cibola Beacon)
- Gallup Independent

== Notable people ==
- Greg Baldwin (born 1960), actor and voice actor
- Joseph Fidel (1923–2015), member of the New Mexico Senate
- George Hanosh (1938–2008), member of the New Mexico House of Representatives
- Al Johnson (1922–2011), NFL player for the Philadelphia Eagles and coach for Western New Mexico University
- Walter K. Martinez (1930–1986), member and speaker of the New Mexico House of Representatives
- W. Ken Martinez (born 1959), member and speaker of the New Mexico House of Representatives
- Paddy Martinez (1881–1969), prospector who discovered uranium at Haystack Mesa
- Dianna Ortiz (born 1961), Roman Catholic sister of the Ursuline order who was abducted by the Guatemalan military
- Clemente Sanchez (born 1958), member of the New Mexico Senate
- Marvin Stephens (1922–2008), actor known for the Mickey McGuire and Jones Family film series
- David Ulibarri, former member of the New Mexico Senate and Cibola County manager
- Jack Wallace (1925–1995), NFL player and coach

== Popular culture ==
- Author Robison Wells has stated in his novel On Second Thought that the fictional town of Alamitos is based on Grants, which is the historical name before it was renamed after the mining camp. Wells lived in Grants during the late-1990s.
- Grants is mentioned as a central location in the Louis L'Amour novel Flint.
