= Angus Archibald Grant =

Real estate developer and entrepreneur

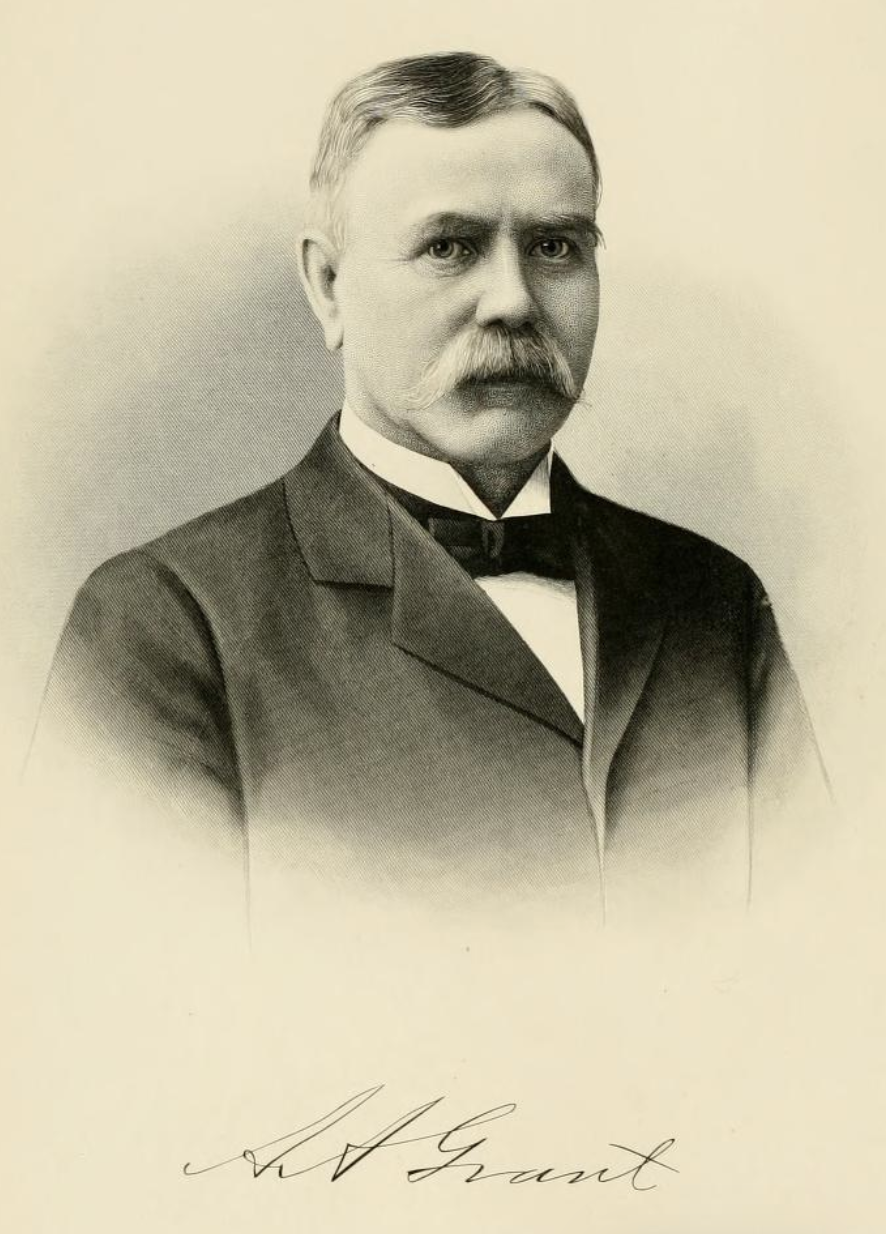
- Born: October 4, 1843; Williamstown, Ontario, Canada
- Died: July 20, 1901; Los Angeles, California (buried in Albuquerque, New Mexico)
- Spouse(s): Johanna Theresa ("Joan") nee McMillan, 1860–1883
- Children: 2, Daniel Garfield Grant Sr., 1881–1953 and Ethel Ann Grant, 1883–1883

Angus A. Grant was the major entrepreneur and real estate developer in Albuquerque, New Mexico during the city's rapid expansion from 1880 through 1901. He held and developed real estate in the downtown core, and was the major developer of Albuquerque's utility infrastructure.

== Biography ==
Grant was born of Highland Scottish extraction in Ontario, Canada.

He began building railroad bridges in 1866 for the Kansas Pacific Railroad and later the Denver & Rio Grande Railroad. His companies (Grant & Hampson, then Grant Brothers) contracted for the Atchison, Topeka and Santa Fe Railroad from 1870 until his death.

Grant and his brothers, John R. and Lewis A., arrived in Albuquerque in 1880 with the arrival of the Atchison, Topeka and Santa Fe Railroad, to whom they were contractors. That year marked the beginning of Albuquerque's emergence from village to city and Grant was there:

- 1882 - Began constructing an electric lighting system for the city.
- 1882 - Consolidated three Albuquerque water companies into the Albuquerque Consolidated Water Works.
- 1882 - Built Albuquerque's Grand Opera House, the second floor of the Grant Block (i.e. building), a commercial structure at the NW corner of Third Street and Railroad (now Central) Avenue. It burned completely in 1898 and was replaced with a new building within six months.
- 1886 - One of at least three companies in the Albuquerque Fire Department was the Angus A. Grant Hose Company.
- 1890 - Helped organize the Crystal Ice Company.
- 1895 - Purchased the Albuquerque Gas Company.
- 1895 - Purchased the Albuquerque Democrat, which he leased to others.
- Early stockholder in the First National Bank of which he was director until he died.

Grant Brothers Construction Company was eventually headquartered in Los Angeles, and at the time (c. 1907) was one of the largest contractors in the United States.

The city of Grants, New Mexico is named for Grant Brothers, which initiated the city with a construction camp during its work on the Atlantic and Pacific Railroad.
