= New Mexico State University Grants =

- Motto: All About Discovery!
- Type: Public community college
- Established: 1968
- President: Mickey D. Best
- Students: 963 (Fall 2017)
- Location: Grants, New Mexico, U.S. 35.1665°N 107.8430°W
- Colors: Crimson and White
- Nickname: Aggies
- Mascot: Pistol Pete
- Website: www.grants.nmsu.edu

New Mexico State University Grants (NMSU Grants) is a public community college in Grants, New Mexico. It is a branch campus of New Mexico State University.

== History ==
NMSU Grants was established as a branch of New Mexico State University in 1968 through the cooperative efforts of New Mexico State University and Grants Municipal Schools.

== Academics ==
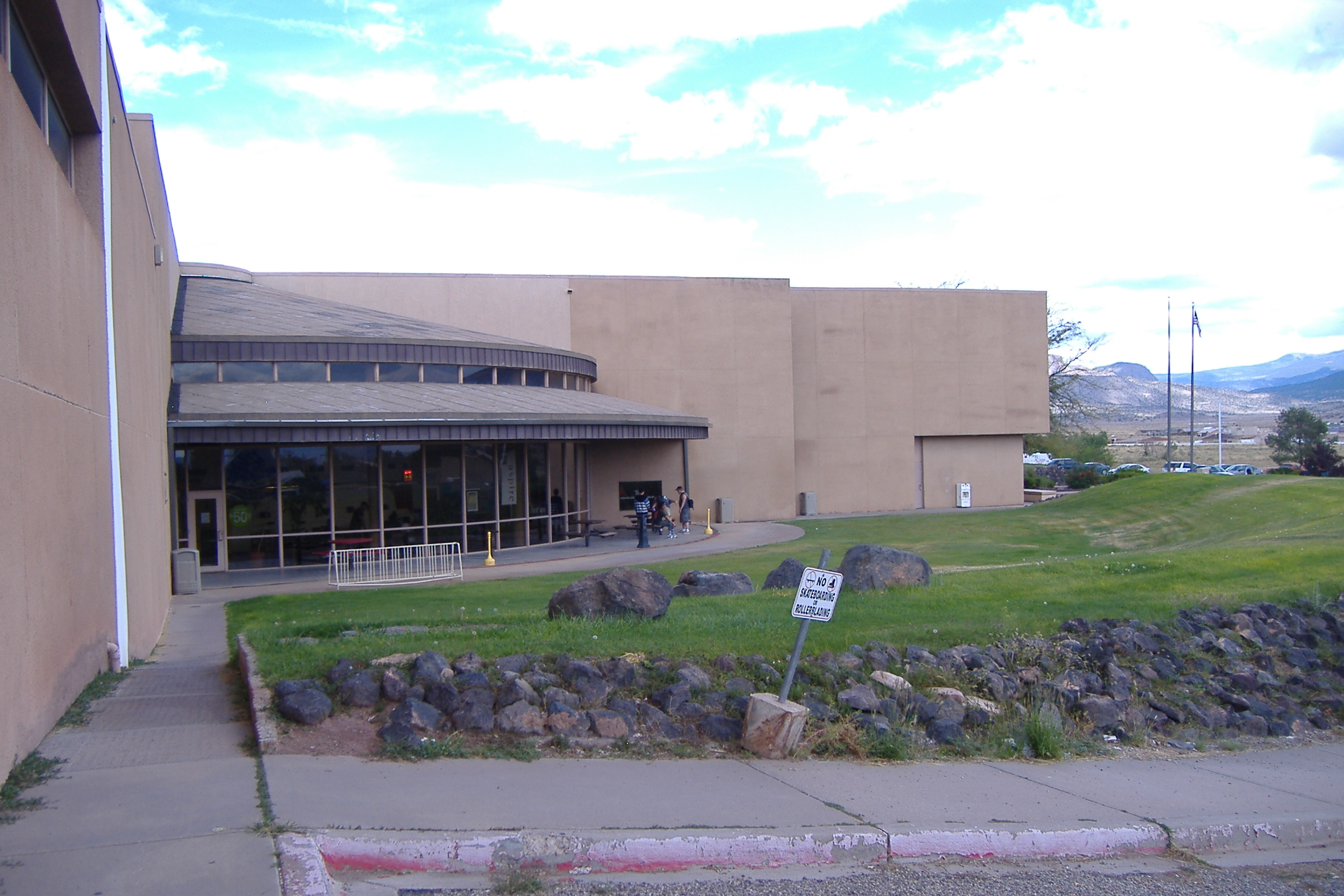
NMSU Grants Martinez Hall Main Building, Cyber Cafe Exterior

The college offer certificates, associate degree, bachelor's and master's degrees through the College of Extended Learning and Distance Learning in Las Cruces, New Mexico. The campus also provides Adult Basic Education program that enable residents to earn a general equivalency diploma (GED), and also hosts Small Business Development Center (SBDC).
