= Molas Formation =

Geologic formation found in the United States

- Stratigraphic range: Bashkirian–Moscovian
- Type: Formation
- Sub-units: Coalbank Hill Member
- Underlies: Pinkerton Trail Formation
- Overlies: Leadville Limestone
- Thickness: 37 m (120 ft)

Lithology
- Primary: Mudrock
- Other: Sandstone, conglomerate

Location
- Coordinates: 37.748°N 107.683°W
- Region: Four Corners
- Country: United States

Type section
- Named for: Molas Lake
- Named by: Cross and Howe
- Year defined: 1905
- Molas Formation (the United States) Molas Formation (Colorado)

The Molas Formation is a geologic formation that is found in the Four Corners region of the United States. Its age is poorly constrained but is thought to be Namurian (late Mississippian to middle Pennsylvanian).

== Description ==
The Molas Formation is a sequence of continental red beds. It is divided into three members. The lowermost Coalbank Hill Member is up to 56 feet (17 m) of purplish-red to reddish-brown siltstone and conglomerate. This is overlain by an informal middle member, consisting of mudrock, sandstone, and conglomerate, that is typically around 40 feet (12 m). The upper member is typically around 25 feet (7.6 m) that includes maroon to light gray sandstone. The upper member grades into the overlying Pinkerton Trail Formation.

The Coalbank Hill Member may be a terra rossa (a residual soil formed by weathering of the underlying Leadville Limestone) and may correlate with the Log Springs Formation in the Jemez Mountains of New Mexico. It has also been interpreted as a loess trapped on the karst surface of the underlying limestone. The middle member and much of the upper member were deposited in a river system that reworked the Coalbank Hill Member sediments, while the upper member includes some marine beds. The boundary between the middle and upper members is set where kaolinite clay becomes more abundant than illite clay.

The formation is exposed in the San Juan Mountains, the Sangre de Cristo Mountains, the Mosquito Range, the Sawatch Range, and at Glenwood Springs, Colorado. It exists in the subsurface throughout the San Juan basin.

== Fossils ==
The Coalbank Hill Member is devoid of fossils, but the upper member contains some marine limestone beds with brachiopods, bryozoans, echinoderms, and forams indicating a middle Pennsylvanian age.

== History of investigation ==
The formation was first designated by Charles Whitman Cross and Ernest Howe in 1905 for deposits near Molas Lake. Sherman Wengerd and John Strickland first divided the formation into three informal members in 1954, and William Merrill and Richard Winar formally designated the Coalbank Hill Member in 1958.
