= Squaw Canyon Oil Field =

Oil field in Utah, USA

Coordinates: 37.46°N 109.14°W

Squaw Canyon Oil Field is located in San Juan County, approximately 25 miles (40 km) southeast of Blanding, Utah. Production is from a northwest–southeast trending 20-foot-thick (6.1 m) carbonate buildup in the Pennsyslvanian Desert Creek. The field is part of the Paradox Basin that extends from the states of Colorado to Utah and New Mexico.

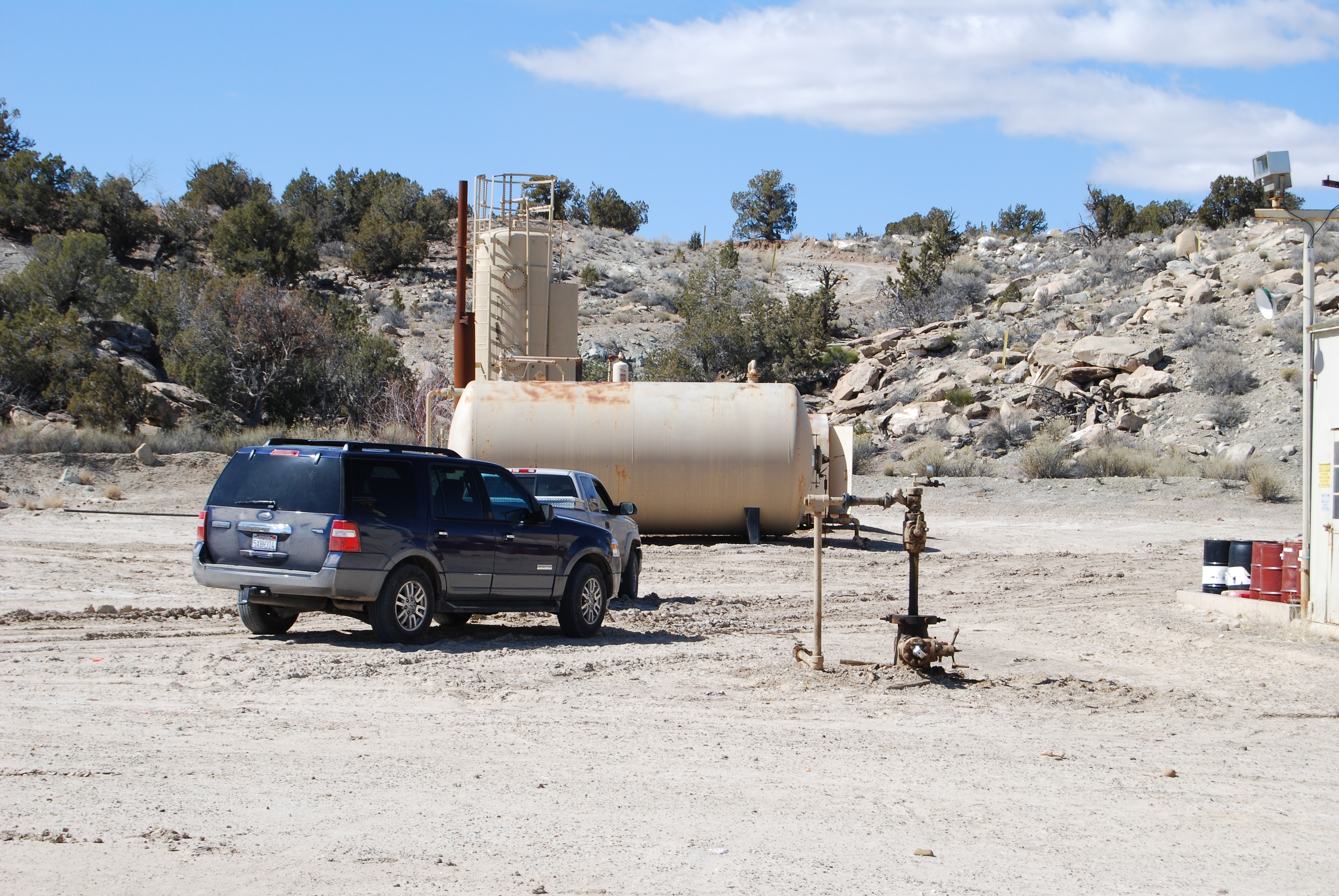
Tin Cup Federal 1-35 Water Injection Well

Reservoir is a carbonate phylloid algal lime wackestone to packstone. The fields are mostly algal mounds, with thick sections saturated with oil. Squaw Canyon Field is approximately .5 miles (0.80 km) long and approximately 1,500 feet (460 m) wide, trending northwest–southeast.

== Discovery ==
The field was discovered in 1984 by MCO Resources Company, with the drilling of the Federal 1-19 well located in Section 19. Initial shut in pressure was 2,046 psig at 5,500 feet.

Initial well being completed in the Desert Creek formation, the initial production rate was 550 barrels of oil per day. Additional development wells were drilled to delineate the extent of the reservoir. The field was discovered using seismic.

Currently the field is operated by Mar/Reg Oil Company, an independent oil company based in Nevada.

== Geology ==
The a cross section of the field. The field is composed of a natural gas cap, oil column. The field was delineated by drilling of five wells.

Algal Mound

The field has cumulative oil production of approximately 350 thousand barrels of oil and 900 million cubic feet of natural gas. The field consists of limestone horizon with vertical fractures that run northeast–southwest. Due to the fracturing, the field is not efficiently drained.

Regional setting: South-central Paradox Basin.

Producing formation(s): Pennsylvanian-Desert Creek zone of the Paradox Formation at approximately 5,500 feet depth. Additional production is from the Honaker Trail and the Ismay formations.

Type of trap: Stratigraphic, carbonate algal-mound.

Desert Creek Isopach

== Oil composition ==
Crude oil produced has the following composition:

- 43.6 - API gravity
- Pour point - 15 degree F.
- Color - Yellow-brown
- Sulfur content - Low
- Viscosity - 0.4 cps

== Natural gas composition ==
- BTU - 1340 to 1470
- Specific gravity - .496

Additional studies by the Utah Department of Geology has encouraged the drilling of horizontal wells to efficiently drain the reservoir.

Paradox Basin. Final Report US Department of Energy
