= Paradox Basin =

Sedimentary basin in the southwestern United States

Coordinates: 38°N 109°W

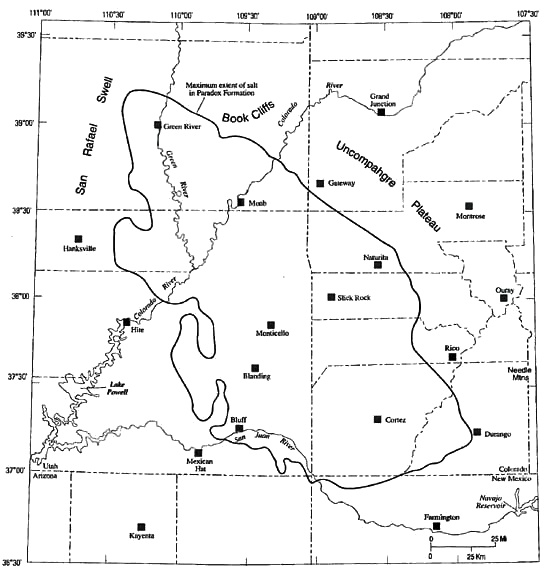
Location map of the Paradox Basin

The Paradox Basin is an asymmetric foreland basin located mostly in southeast Utah and southwest Colorado, but extending into northeast Arizona and northwest New Mexico. The basin is a large elongate northwest to southeast oriented depression formed during the late Paleozoic Era. The basin is bordered on the east by the tectonically uplifted Uncompahgre Plateau, on the northwest by the San Rafael Swell and extends partway into the Monument Uplift to the west.

Its area is roughly 33,000 square miles (85470 km^{2}). The combined sedimentary strata of the Paradox Basin are more than 15,000 feet (4600 m) thick in some places.

Unlike most Rocky Mountain basins, the Paradox Basin is an evaporite basin containing sediments from alternating cycles of deep marine and very shallow water. As a result of the thick salt sequences and the fact that salt is ductile at relatively low temperatures and pressures, salt tectonics play a major role in the post-Pennsylvanian structural deformation within the basin.

== History ==
Scientists believe the seawater at the base of Paradox Basin may have been trapped there for several hundred million years. However, in 2022 researchers attempting to date the basin unexpectedly discovered relatively "young" water as far down as three kilometers (1.9 miles). "The fresh influx would have been delivered by rainfall, snow melt or natural aquifers as recently as between 400,000 and 1.1 million years ago."

== Natural resources ==
Natural resources extracted from the basin include petroleum, uranium, copper, and potash.

Much of the petroleum production in the basin has come from porous carbonate deposits, such as algal mounds, of Pennsylvanian age. Additional reservoir types include uplifted fault blocks and discontinuous clastic beds with both stratigraphic and structural traps. The principal productive horizons in the basin include the Mississippian Leadville Limestone, the Pennsylvanian Hermosa Group (Honaker Trail, Paradox, and Pinkerton Trail formations) and the Permian age Cutler Formation.

Discoveries in the Cane Creek Shale of the Paradox Formation have resulted in new oil production near Moab, Utah.

== See also ==
- Paradox Valley, which gave the basin its name
