= Elbert Formation =

Geologic formation in Colorado, United States

- Stratigraphic range: upper Devonian
- Type: Formation
- Underlies: Ouray Formation
- Overlies: Aneth Formation
- Thickness: 44 m (145 ft)

Lithology
- Primary: Sandstone, mudrock, carbonate rock

Location
- Coordinates: 37°35′42″N 107°51′07″W
- Region: Four Corners
- Country: United States

Type section
- Named for: Elbert Creek
- Named by: Cross
- Year defined: 1904
- Elbert Formation (the United States) Elbert Formation (Colorado)

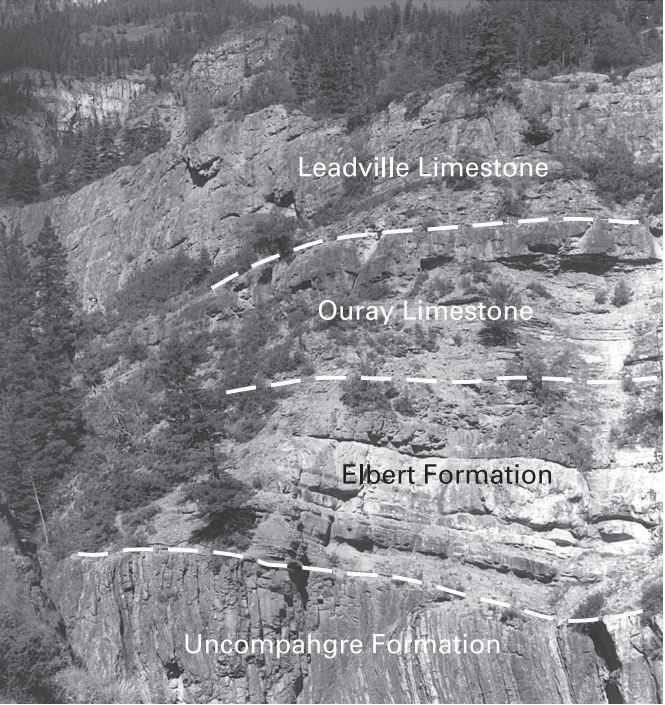
Outcrop in the Uncompahgre Gorge with key geological formations], including the Ouray Formation, Elbert Formation, and the Leadville Limestone

The Elbert Formation is a geologic formation that crops out in the San Juan Mountains of southwestern Colorado. The formation contains fossils indicating it is upper Devonian in age.

== Description ==
The Elbert Formation is divided into the lower McCracken Sandstone Member and upper unnamed member. The McCracken Sandstone Member consists mostly of gray to brown very fine to coarse grained sandstone, with lesser amounts of dolomite and gray to green shale. The sandstones are very highly cemented, with almost no pore space. The member is distinguished from the underlying Ignacio Formation by its relative lack of feldspar. The McCracken Sandstone Member was first identified in the subsurface, where the Aneth Formation is sometimes found between the McCracken Member and the Ignacio Formation. It crops out at the surface near the Needle Mountains. Total thickness is up to 43 meters (140 ft).

The remainder of the Elbert Formation consists of thin-bedded brownish-gray dolomite and sandstone, green to red shale, and small amounts of anhydrite. It is well exposed at the surface in the Piedra River canyon. The formation is overlain by the Ouray Formation. Maximum thickness is up to 91 meters (300 ft).

The McCracken Sandstone Member is interpreted as shallow marine sand deposited during a rise in sea level (a transgression). The upper member contains casts of salt crystals, stromatolites, and fish fossils suggesting it was deposited in a tidal flat environment during a time of increasing sea depth and tectonic stability. The area was at the western edge of the Transcontinental Arch and the formation may record deposition along a rocky shoreline, a depositional environment rarely preserved in the geological record.

== Fossils ==
The Elbert Formation contains remains of fossilized fish characteristic of the upper Devonian.

== Economic resources ==
The Elbert Formation extends in the subsurface into Utah, where the McCracken Sandstone Member is an important petroleum reservoir at Lisbon Valley.

== History of investigation ==
The formation was first designated by Charles Whitman Cross in 1904 for exposures at Elbert Creek. The McCracken Sandstone Member was designated in 1955 by R.L. Knight and J.C. Cooper. Evans, Maurer, and Holm-Denoma recommended reassigning the McCracken Sandstone to the underlying Ignacio Formation in 2019.
