= Grants-Milan Flight Service Station =

- U.S. National Register of Historic Places
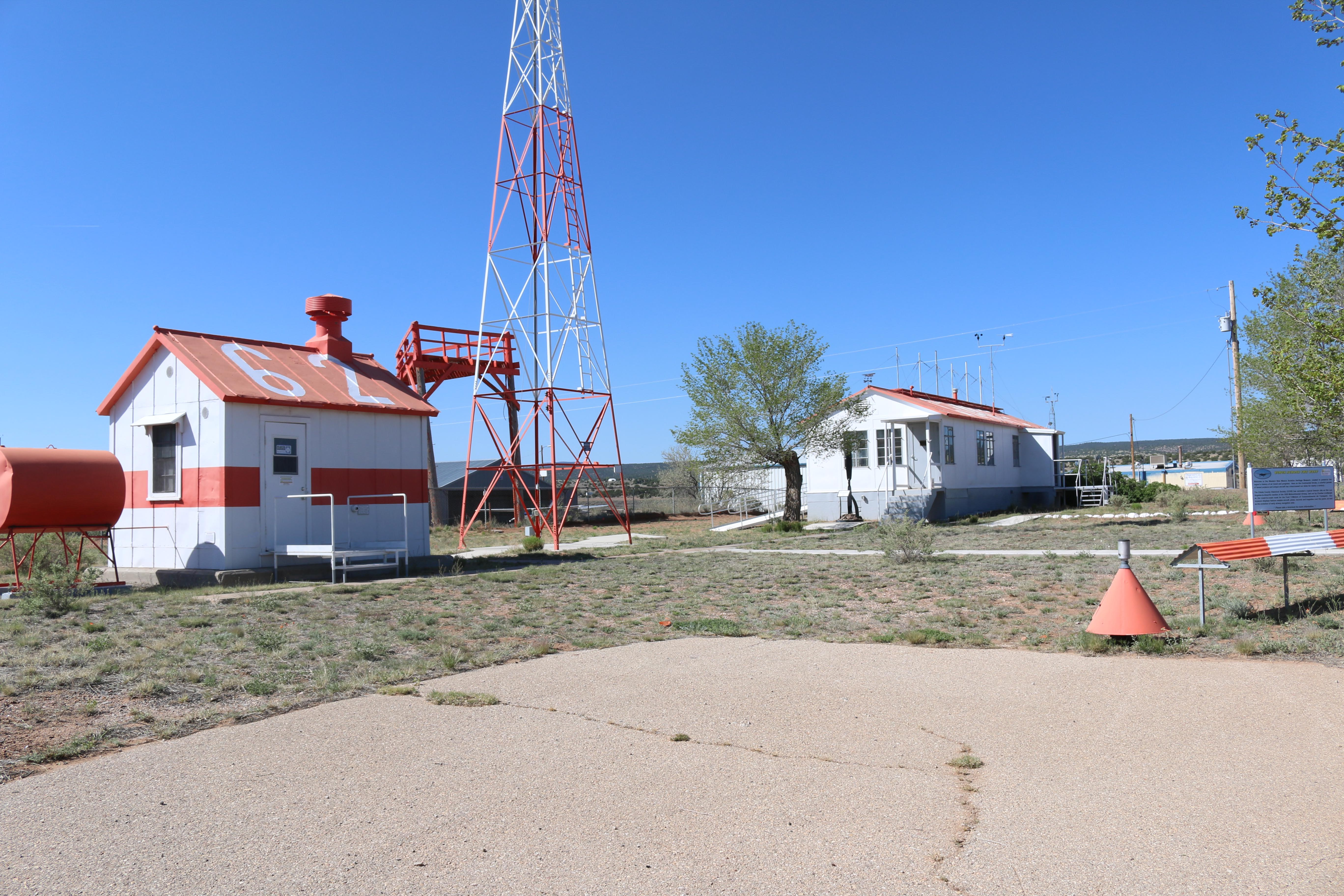

- Location within New Mexico
- Location: 1116 N. Dale Carnutte Rd., Grants, New Mexico
- Coordinates: 35°09′59″N 107°53′51″W
- Built by: Charley Diaz
- MPS: Route 66 through New Mexico MPS
- NRHP reference No.: 15000492
- Added to NRHP: August 3, 2015

The Grants-Milan Flight Service Station, at 1116 N. Dale Carnutte Rd. in Grants, New Mexico, was added to the National Register of Historic Places in 2015.

It was then part of the Western New Mexico Aviation Heritage Museum, which honors early aviation pioneers who flew the Los Angeles-to-Amarillo segment of the Midcontinental Airway.

It is a flight service station that was built in 1953 to serve the Grants-Milan Municipal Airport.

== Western New Mexico Aviation Heritage Museum ==
The Western New Mexico Aviation Heritage Museum is a small aviation museum located at the Grants-Milan airport (KGNT) in Grants, New Mexico. It was dedicated on June 9, 2012.

It commemorates the Los Angeles to Amarillo segment of the Transcontinental Air Transport, an early air mail provider. It consists of two 1929 structures: a 55-foot beacon tower and a small building with a generator. It also has a concrete arrow which helped aviators find the correct direction to continue in.
