= Haystack, New Mexico =

- Census-designated place
- Location within New Mexico Location within the United States
- Coordinates: 35°21′6″N 107°55′52″W
- Country: United States
- State: New Mexico
- County: McKinley

Area
  - Total: 4.27 sq mi (11.06 km^{2})
  - Land: 4.26 sq mi (11.04 km^{2})
  - Water: 0.0077 sq mi (0.02 km^{2})
- Elevation: 7,031 ft (2,143 m)

Population (2020)
  - Total: 233
  - Density: 54.7/sq mi (21.11/km^{2})
- Time zone: UTC-7 (Mountain (MST))
  - Summer (DST): UTC-6 (MDT)
- ZIP Code: 87045 (Prewitt)
- Area code: 505
- FIPS code: 35-31925
- GNIS feature ID: 2806718

Haystack is an unincorporated community and census-designated place (CDP) in McKinley County, New Mexico, United States. As of the 2020 census, it had a population of 233.

Haystack was a significant area of uranium mining during the mid-20th century.

== Geography ==
The community is in the southeastern part of the county, 7 miles (11 km) east of Prewitt. Haystack Mountain, elevation 7,833 feet (2,387 m), is a mesa that rises 800 feet (240 m) above the surrounding land in the west part of the CDP. County Road 23 (Haystack Road) forms the southern edge of the CDP, and County Road 41 (Red Mountain Road) runs north-south through the CDP.

According to the U.S. Census Bureau, the Haystack CDP has an area of 4.27 square miles (11.06 km^{2}), of which 0.007 square miles (0.018 km^{2}), or 0.16%, are water. The area drains south toward San Mateo Creek and the Rio San Jose, part of the Rio Puerco watershed leading southeast to the Rio Grande.

== Demographics ==
Historical population
| Census | Pop. | Note | %± |
|---|---|---|---|
| 2020 | 233 | | — |
U.S. Decennial Census

Haystack was first listed as a CDP prior to the 2020 census.

== Education ==
It is in Gallup-McKinley County Public Schools.
