= Pinkerton Trail Formation =

Geologic formation in the United States

- Stratigraphic range: Moscovian
- Type: Formation
- Unit of: Hermosa Group
- Underlies: Paradox Formation
- Overlies: Molas Formation
- Thickness: 180 m (600 ft)

Lithology
- Primary: Limestone
- Other: Shale

Location
- Coordinates: 37.456°N 107.804°W
- Region: Four Corners
- Country: United States

Type section
- Named for: Pinkerton Trail
- Named by: Wengerd and Strickland
- Year defined: 1954
- Pinkerton Trail Formation (the United States) Pinkerton Trail Formation (Colorado)

The Pinkerton Trail Formation is a geologic formation that is found in the Four Corners region of the United States. It contains fossils characteristic of the Atokan and Desmoinesian Ages of the Pennsylvanian.

== Description ==
The Pinkerton Trail Formation is the lowest member of the Hermosa Group, a group of geological formations deposited in the interior and margins of the Paradox basin during the Pennsylvanian. The Pinkerton Trail Formation consists of gray limestone with occasional beds of black shale. North of Durango, it contains significant clastic sediments. It rests on the Molas Formation and is overlain by the Paradox Formation. Its thickness is up to 600 feet (180 m) in the subsurface.

The formation is exposed in the Durango, Colorado area and is present in the subsurface in the San Juan basin and the Paradox basin. It was deposited by the advance of the sea (a transgression) over the region, which deposited limestone atop the continental sediments of the Molas Formation.

== Fossils ==
The formation is fossiliferous, containing crinoids and fusulinids that place its age in the Atokan to Desmoinesian Ages of the Pennsylvanian.

== History of investigation ==
The formation was first designated by Sherman Wengerd and John Strickland in 1954 as part of their work raising the Hermosa Formation to group stratigraphic rank. It was named for exposures at the Pinkerton Trail, about 12 miles (19 km) north of Durango, Colorado. Baars, Parker, and Chronic proposed a subsurface reference section in 1967 in the Paradox basin.
