= Ouray Formation =

Geologic formation in Colorado

- Stratigraphic range: Devonian
- Type: Formation

Location
- Region: Colorado
- Country: United States

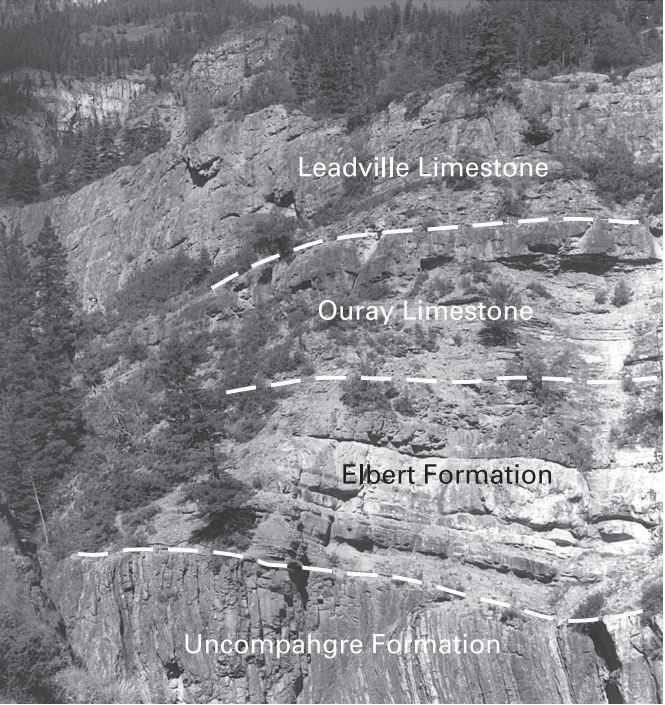
Outcrop in the Uncompahgre Gorge with key geological formations], including the Ouray Formation, Elbert Formation, and the Leadville Limestone

The Ouray Formation is a geologic formation in Colorado. It preserves fossils dating back to the Devonian period.

== See also ==
- List of fossiliferous stratigraphic units in Colorado
- Paleontology in Colorado
