= Grants-Milan Municipal Airport =

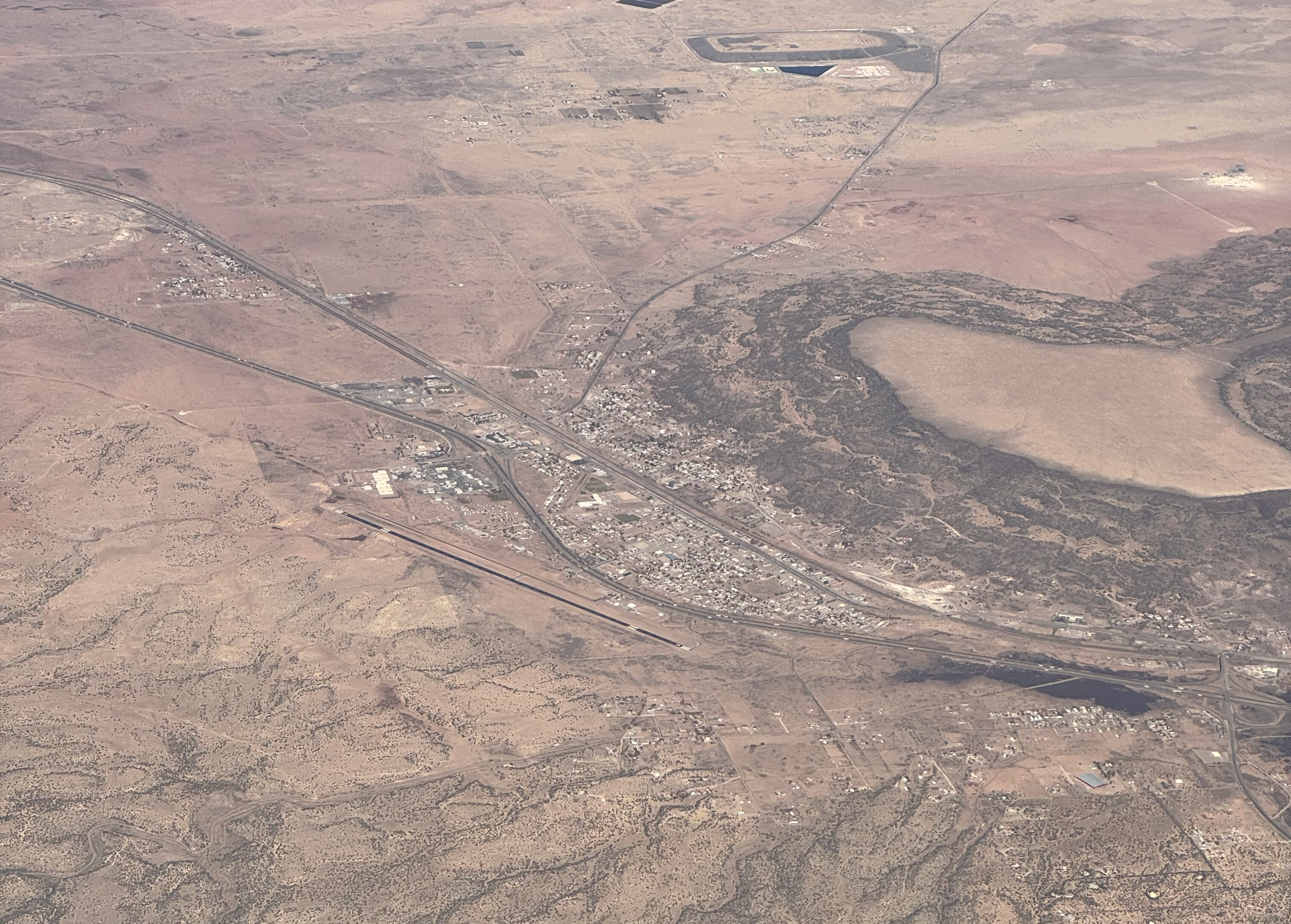
- IATA: GNT; ICAO: KGNT; FAA LID: GNT

Summary
- Airport type: Public
- Owner: City of Grants
- Serves: Grants, New Mexico
- Elevation AMSL: 6,537 ft (1,992 m)
- Coordinates: 35°10′2.2″N 107°54′7.4″W

Map
- Location within New Mexico

Runways
Direction	Length		Surface
Direction	ft	m	Surface
13/31	7,172	2,186	Asphalt

Statistics (2024)
- Based aircraft: 11
- Source: Federal Aviation Administration

Grants-Milan Municipal Airport (IATA: GNT, ICAO: KGNT, FAA LID: GNT) is a public airport located in Milan, New Mexico, 3 miles northwest of Grants, in Cibola County, New Mexico, United States.
