= Mount Sedgwick (New Mexico) =

Mountain in New Mexico, USA

- Location within New Mexico

Highest point
- Elevation: 9,256 ft (2,821 m)
- Prominence: 1,866 ft (569 m)
- Coordinates: 35°10′28″N 108°05′42″W

Geography
- Location: Cibola County, New Mexico, U.S.
- Parent range: Zuni Mountains
- Topo map: USGS Mount Sedgwick

Mount Sedgwick in New Mexico at 9,256 feet (2,821 m) is the highest peak in the Zuni Mountains.
