= Ignacio Formation =

Geologic formation in southwestern Colorado

- Stratigraphic range: upper Devonian
- Type: Formation
- Sub-units: Spud Hill Member; Tamarron Hill Member
- Underlies: Elbert Formation
- Overlies: Precambrian basement
- Thickness: 32 m (105 ft)

Lithology
- Primary: Sandstone, mudrock
- Other: Carbonate rock, conglomerate

Location
- Coordinates: 37°34′59″N 107°47′56″W
- Region: Four Corners
- Country: United States

Type section
- Named for: Ignacio Lake
- Named by: Cross and Spencer
- Year defined: 1899
- Ignacio Formation (the United States) Ignacio Formation (Colorado)

The Ignacio Formation (Ingacio Quartzite) is a geologic formation that crops out in the San Juan Mountains of southwestern Colorado. Long thought to be Cambrian in age, the formation is now thought to be upper Devonian in age, based on detrital zircon geochronology and other evidence.

== Description ==
The Ignacio Formation is a complex and diverse formation, made up mostly of sandstone and mudrock with smaller amounts of carbonate rock, conglomerate, and evaporites that have been replaced by other minerals. The formation crops out in the San Juan Mountains of Colorado but may be present in the subsurface over a much wider region, including the Paradox Basin. The maximum thickness is about 32 meters (105 ft). The formation is overlain by the Elbert Formation.

The formation is divided into a lower Tamarron Member and upper Spud Hill Member. The latter shows more shale and trace fossils than the former.

The age of the Ignacio Formation has been controversial. It was assigned to the Cambrian by Charles Whitman Cross and A.C. Spencer in 1899, when they first described the formation, and was thought to correlate with the Tintic Quartzite and the Tapeats Sandstone. However, Earle F. McBride concluded in 2016 that the formation is actually late Devonian in age, based on discovery of an Ordovician zircon grain in the formation and the presence well-dated placoderm fish plates. This conclusion has been shared by some subsequent researchers.

The formation is interpreted as sediments deposited in a tide-dominated estuary setting during a rise in sea level (a transgression). At least three paleovalleys have been identified in the underlying Precambrian rock that are filled by the Ignacio Formation. These are up to 30 kilometers (19 mi) wide and over 42 meters (138 ft) deep and run from southeast to northwest. The deposits show sedimentary structures indicating a longshore current to the north. The area was at the western edge of the Transcontinental Arch.

== History of investigation ==
The formation was first designated by Cross and Spencer in 1899. McBride renamed the unit as the Ignacio Formation, and divided it into members, in 2016.
