= Haystack Mountain (New Mexico) =

Mesa near Prewitt, New Mexico, United States

- Location within New Mexico

Highest point
- Elevation: 7,833 ft (2,387 m)
- Prominence: 900 feet (270 m)
- Coordinates: 35°21′19″N 107°56′51″W

Geography
- Location: McKinley County, New Mexico, U.S.
- Parent range: Zuni Mountains, part of the Colorado Plateau
- Topo map(s): USGS Bluewater, NM

Climbing
- Easiest route: Drive

Haystack Mountain is a mesa approximately 4 miles (6 km) east of Prewitt in McKinley County, New Mexico, United States.

== Geography ==
Haystack Mountain is a lone peak in the Zuni Mountains range in the southeast part of the Colorado Plateau and is clearly visible from nearby Interstate 40. There is a Vertical Angle Benchmark from the National Geodetic Survey which marks the top of the mesa at 7,833 feet (2,387 m).

== History ==
From 1950 to 1980, this area was one of the highest uranium producing regions in the country.

The Haystack Archaeological District is a protected area on the side of the mesa which is on the National Register of Historic Places as an Ancestral Puebloan dwelling from 500–1500 AD.
