= Zuñi Mountains =

Mountain range in New Mexico, United States

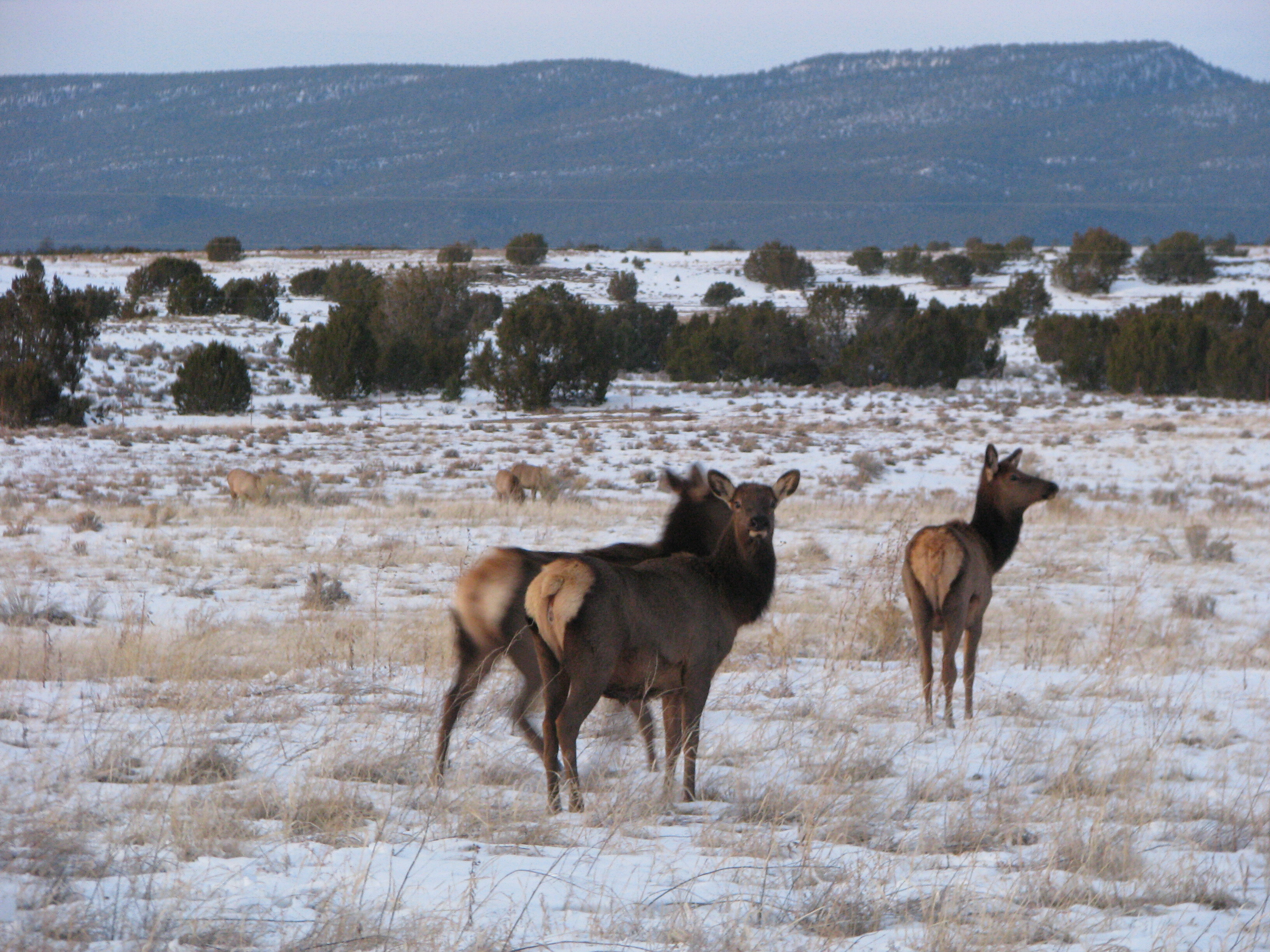
- Elk with Zuñi Mountains in background

Highest point
- Peak: Mount Sedgwick
- Elevation: 9,256 ft (2,821 m)
- Coordinates: 35°10′26″N 108°05′42″W

Dimensions
- Length: 60 mi (97 km) NW
- Width: 40 mi (64 km)

Naming
- Native name: Naasht'ézhí Dził (Navajo)

Geography
- Location within New Mexico
- Country: United States
- State: New Mexico
- Range coordinates: 35°10′4″N 108°19′0″W

Geology
- Orogeny: Laramide

The Zuñi Mountains (Navajo: Naasht'ézhí Dził or Ńdíshchííʼ Ląʼí) are a mountain range located mainly in Cibola County of northwestern New Mexico, United States, with a small portion extending into McKinley County. The range is located largely in the Cibola National Forest, lying south of Interstate 40 from southeast of Gallup to southwest of Grants. The range is about sixty miles (97 km) long and forty miles (64 km) wide. The highest point is Mount Sedgwick, 9,256 feet (2,821 m); elevations in the range go down to 6,400 feet (1,950 m).

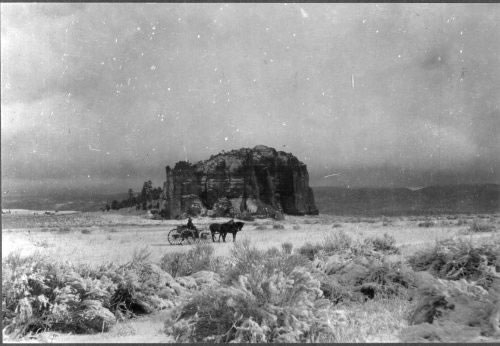
Zuñi Mountains in 1908

== Location ==
The Zuñi Mountains are surrounded by the Zuni Indian Reservation, the Ramah Navajo Indian Reservation, and El Morro National Monument to the southwest, El Malpais National Monument to the south, Acoma Pueblo to the east, and the Navajo Nation to the north. The towns of Grants, Gallup, and Ramah are located northeast, northwest, and southwest of the range, respectively. The Zuñi Mountains sit on the Continental Divide and form part of the southeastern edge of the Colorado Plateau.

== History ==
The history of the range includes ancient and continuing use of the mountains by local native peoples, including the Zuni, Acoma, and Navajo; extensive logging in the early half of the 20th century; and agriculture and mining (including copper and fluorspar) in the mid-20th century.

== Geology ==
The Zuñi Mountains form a northwest–southeast trending uplift with a core of Precambrian granite and metamorphic rocks, surrounded by Late Permian and Triassic to Jurassic strata. A total of 20,000 ft (6,000 m) of previously overlying layers of Cretaceous and older sedimentary rocks have been eroded away from the highest part of the range, but appear in outlying areas to the west and to the northeast in San Juan Basin. Precambrian rocks in the range were uplifted during the Ancestral Rocky Mountains orogeny as part of the Zuni-Defiance Uplift in the Pennsylvanian Period. The current physiographic expression of the range is the result of uplift during the Cretaceous–Paleogene Laramide Orogeny approximately 80 to 40 million years ago.

== See also ==
- List of mountain ranges of New Mexico
