= Leadville Limestone =

Mississippian geologic formation in the western United States

- Stratigraphic range: Carboniferous
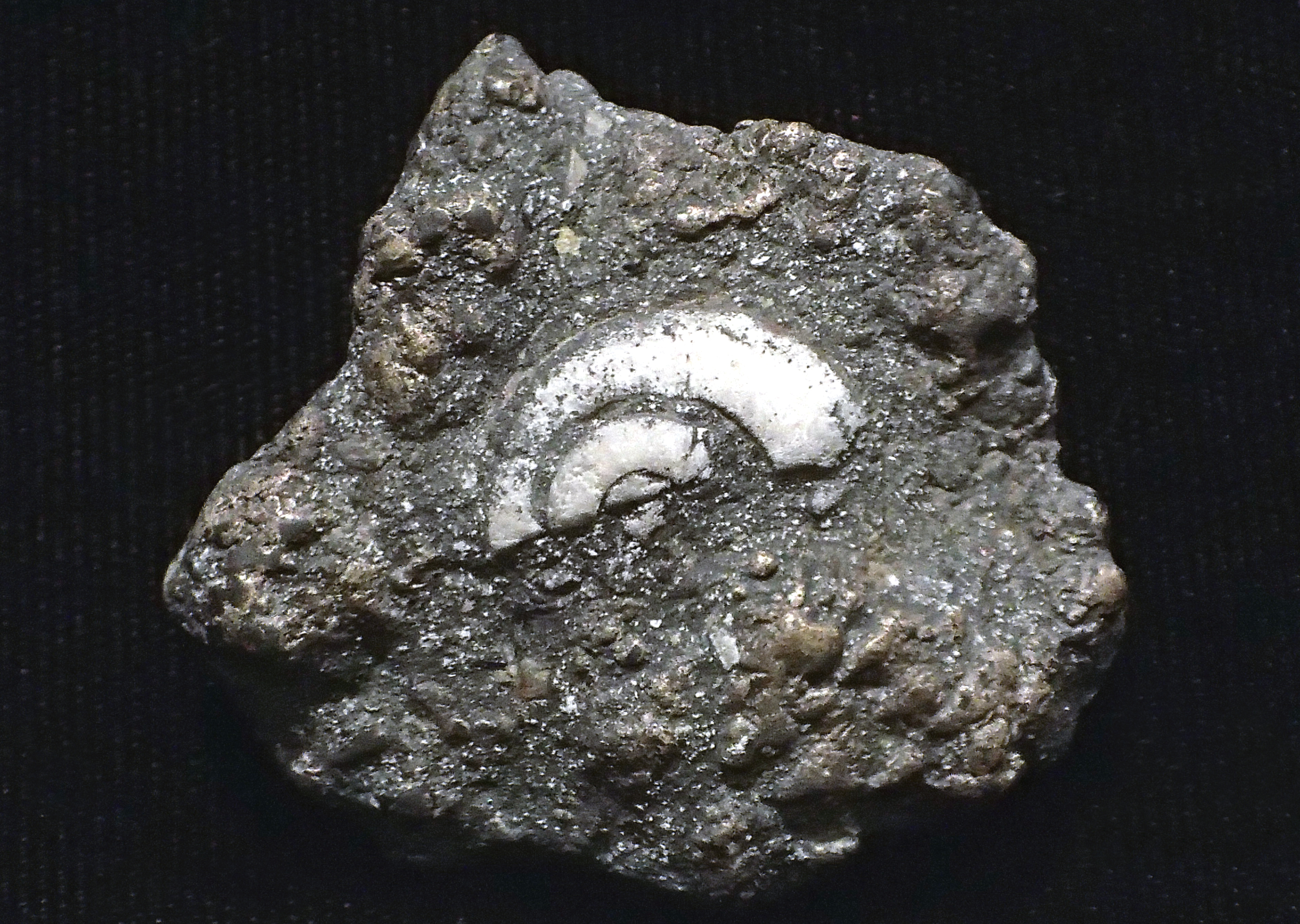
- Silver-replaced gastropod in fossiliferous limestone (Leadville Limestone; Aspen, Colorado)
- Type: Formation
- Sub-units: Castle Butte Member, Red Cliff Member, Yule Marble (informal)
- Underlies: Molas Formation
- Overlies: Chaffee Formation
- Thickness: 220 feet (Marble Quadrangle, CO)

Location
- Region: Western U.S.
- Country: United States
- Extent: AZ, CO, NM, UT

Type section
- Named for: Leadville, Colorado

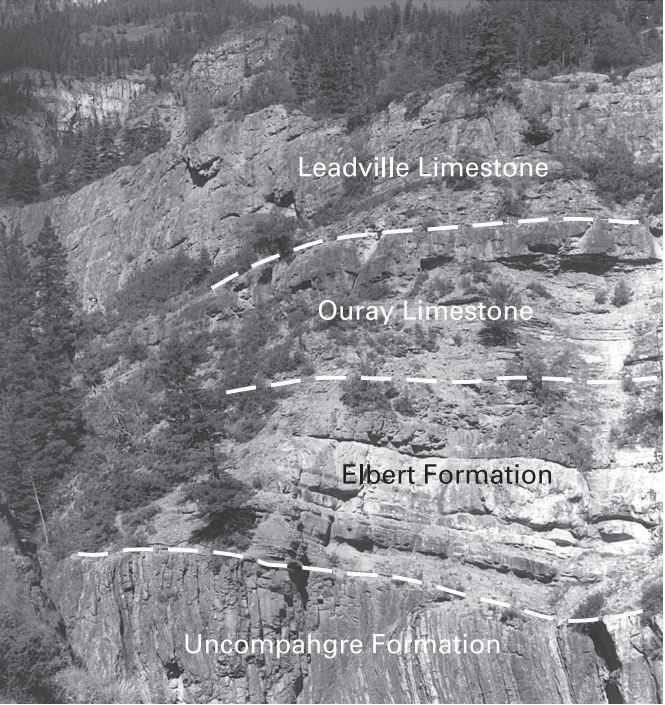
Outcrop in the Uncompahgre Gorge with key geological formations, including the Ouray Formation, Elbert Formation, and the Leadville Limestone

The Leadville Limestone is a Mississippian geologic formation in the western United States. In Colorado, the upper part is oolitic limestone, while the lower part is primarily dolomite, and somewhat sandy beds indicate the bottom of the formation.

The formation is sparsely fossiliferous but contains many calcareous algae, Foraminifera (Endothyra), sponges, corals (Syringopora), Bryozoa, many brachiopods, gastropods (Bellerophon, Straparolus), Cephalopoda, fragments of ostracods, abundant fragments of crinoids, echinoid spines, and teeth of fish.

A metamorphic facies of this formation is known as the Yule Marble and has been quarried for construction materials.

== See also ==
- List of fossiliferous stratigraphic units in Colorado
- Paleontology in Colorado
