= Geology of the Canyonlands area =

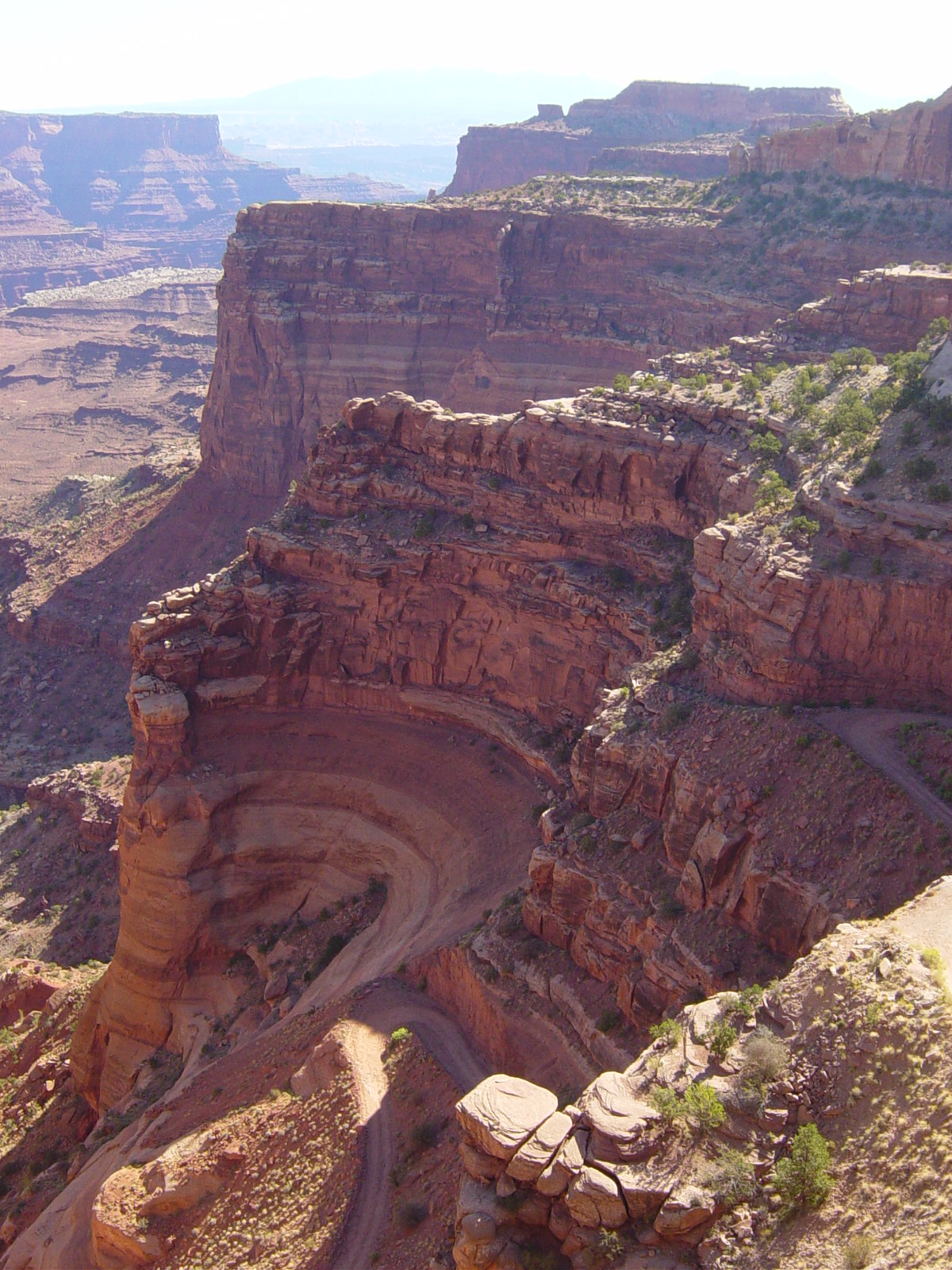
Shafer Canyon Overlook, Canyonlands.

The geology of the park is the consequence of deposition, uplift and erosion. Island in the Sky is a mesa overlooking the Green River (Colorado River tributary) to the west and the Colorado River to the east, and separated from the Colorado Plateau by "the neck". From the top of the mesa to the Honaker Trail Formation at the canyon river bottom, 150 million years of geologic stratum is exposed. Upheaval Dome consists of the Chinle Formation in the center and the Navajo Sandstone along the rim. The Cedar Mesa Sandstone comprised the Needles District. Canyons comprise the Maze District.

== Deposition of sediments ==
The exposed geology of the Canyonlands area is complex and diverse; 12 formations are exposed in Canyonlands National Park that range in age from Pennsylvanian to Cretaceous. The oldest and perhaps most interesting was created from evaporites deposited from evaporating seawater. Various fossil-rich limestones, sandstones, and shales were deposited by advancing and retreating warm shallow seas through much of the remaining Paleozoic.

Eroded sediment from a nearby mountain range later mixed with coastal dune and sand bar deposits. The end of the Paleozoic and the start of the Mesozoic saw the seas retreat from the region until the late Cenozoic. A subdued topography was dominated by flood plains and tidal flats. Now much further inland, the Triassic climate in the region was dry. Vast deserts covered much of that part of North America, except for one period when streams for a time fought the sand dunes. Wetter times returned in the Cretaceous as the area was flooded by the Western Interior Seaway.

The uplifting of the Rocky Mountains starting in late Cretaceous - greatly affected the Canyonlands region. Erosion rates increased and further quickened the onset of the ice ages in the Pleistocene. Modern-day erosion occurs at a slower rate.

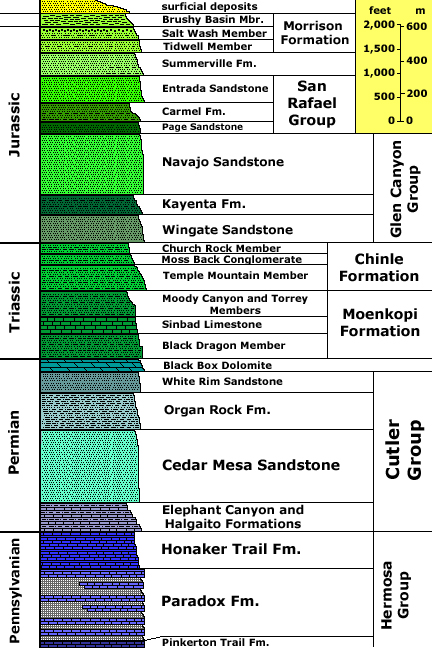
Stratigraphy of Canyonlands area - USGS

=== Hermosa Group ===
A vast sea covered the region in early Pennsylvanian time. A basin in the area called Paradox Basin subsided and a mountain range called the Uncompahgre Mountains was uplifted to the east. Great quantities of seawater were trapped in the subsiding basin and water became increasingly saline in the hot and dry climate. Thousands of feet of evaporites (anhydrite and gypsum then halite) started to build up in the Mid Pennsylvanian and storms occasionally washed sediment from the nearby mountains. Fresh seawater periodically refilled the basin but was never able to flush out the very salty water there (the new water in fact floated on top of the brine). These beds were later lithified to become the Paradox Formation, which in turn is part of the Hermosa Group. Compressed salt beds from the Paradox started to flow plastically later in the Pennsylvanian and probably continued to move from then until the end of the Jurassic. Satellite-based measurements indicate that flow of salt and gypsum continues today to cause flexing and faulting of overlying sedimentary layers.

The Paradox is up to 5000 feet (1520 m) thick in places and in the park is exposed at the bottom of Cataract Canyon as rock gypsum inter-bedded with black shale. Upward movement of the Paradox is also a possible theory for the creation of Upheaval Dome, although none of the Paradox is exposed on the dome, the predominant theory being a meteor crater.

A warm shallow sea again flooded the region near the end of the Pennsylvanian. Limey oozes, sand, and mud were deposited on top of the salt-filled basin. These sediments became the fossil-rich limestones, sandstones, and shales of the gray-colored Honaker Trail Formation. Outcrops of the Honaker Trail can be seen near the bottom of deep canyons in the park, most notably along the Colorado River.

A period of erosion then ensued, creating a break in the geologic record called an unconformity.

=== Cutler Group ===
Early in the Permian a transgressing (advancing) sea laid down the Halgaito Shale. Coastal lowlands returned to the area after the sea regressed (retreated), forming the Elephant Canyon Formation. These formations can now be seen in Cataract and Elephant Canyons.

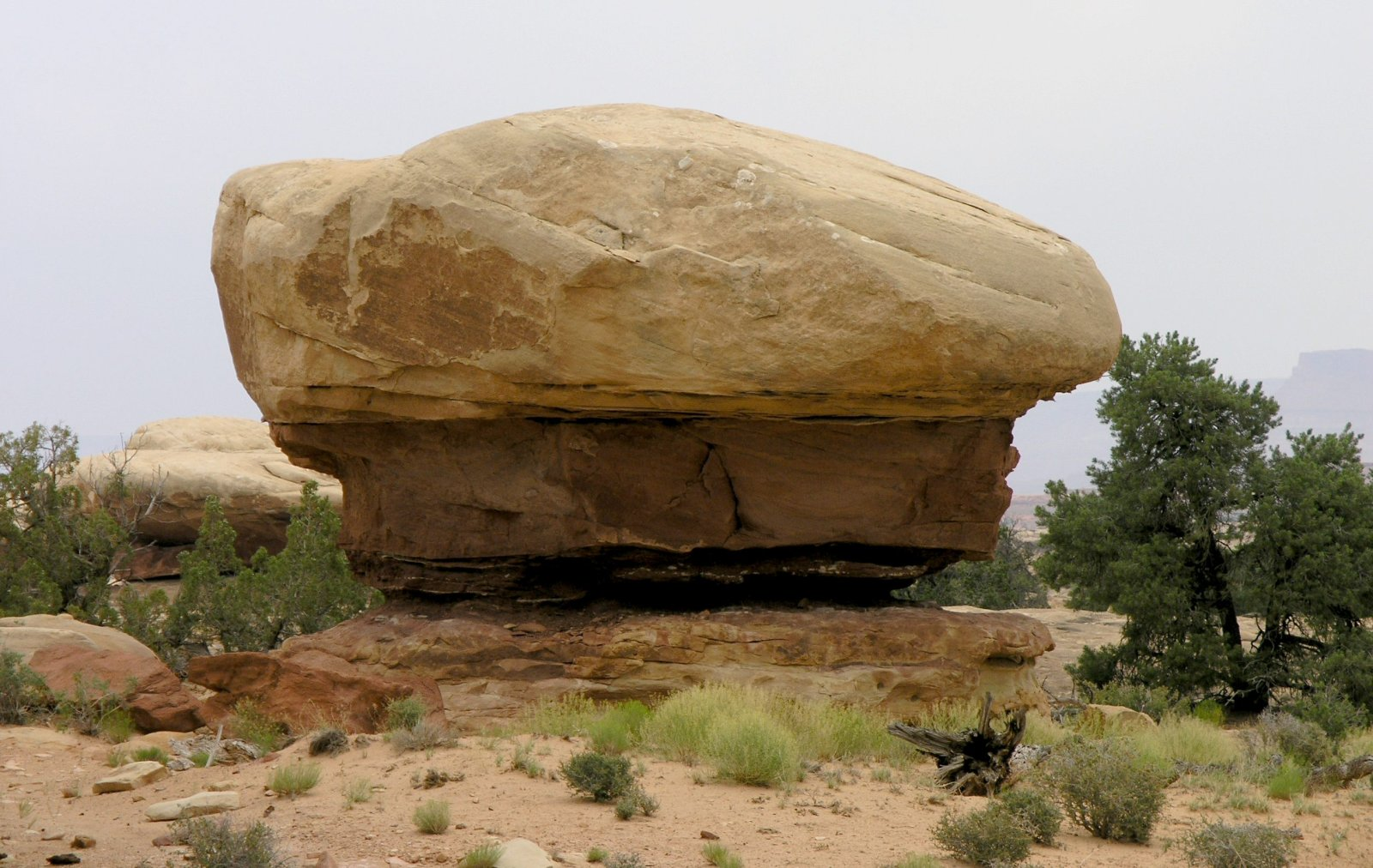
White Rim Sandstone overlaying Organ Rock Shale, Canyonlands, Utah.

The Uncompahgre Mountains (Uncompahgre Plateau) were undergoing extensive erosion during this time. Large alluvial fans filled the basin where it met the range. The resulting Cutler red beds are made of iron-rich arkose sandstone. Underwater sand bars and sand dunes on the coast inter-fingered with the red beds and later became the white-colored cliff-forming Cedar Mesa Sandstone. Today these two competing rock units are exposed in a 4 to 5 mile (6.4 to 8 km) wide belt across the park, stretching from south of the Needles through the Maze and to the Elaterite Basin.

Brightly colored oxidized muds were deposited on top of the Cedar Mesa and ranged in color from red to brown. These sediments eventually became the slope-forming Organ Rock Shale formation and can be seen in the Land of Standing Rocks part of the park.

Coastal sand dunes and marine sand bars once again became dominant, creating the cross-bedded cliff-forming White Rim Sandstone. It is exposed as a topographic bench 1200 feet (365 m) below the top of Island in the Sky (thus earning its name) and along the White Rim Road. A fossilized offshore sand bar made of the White Cliff Sandstone is also exposed in the Elaterite Basin. A tarry dark-brown oil called elaterite seeps out of the structure, giving the basin its name.

The Permian sea retreated, which exposed the land to a long period of erosion and thus created a second unconformity.

=== Moenkopi and Chinle formations ===
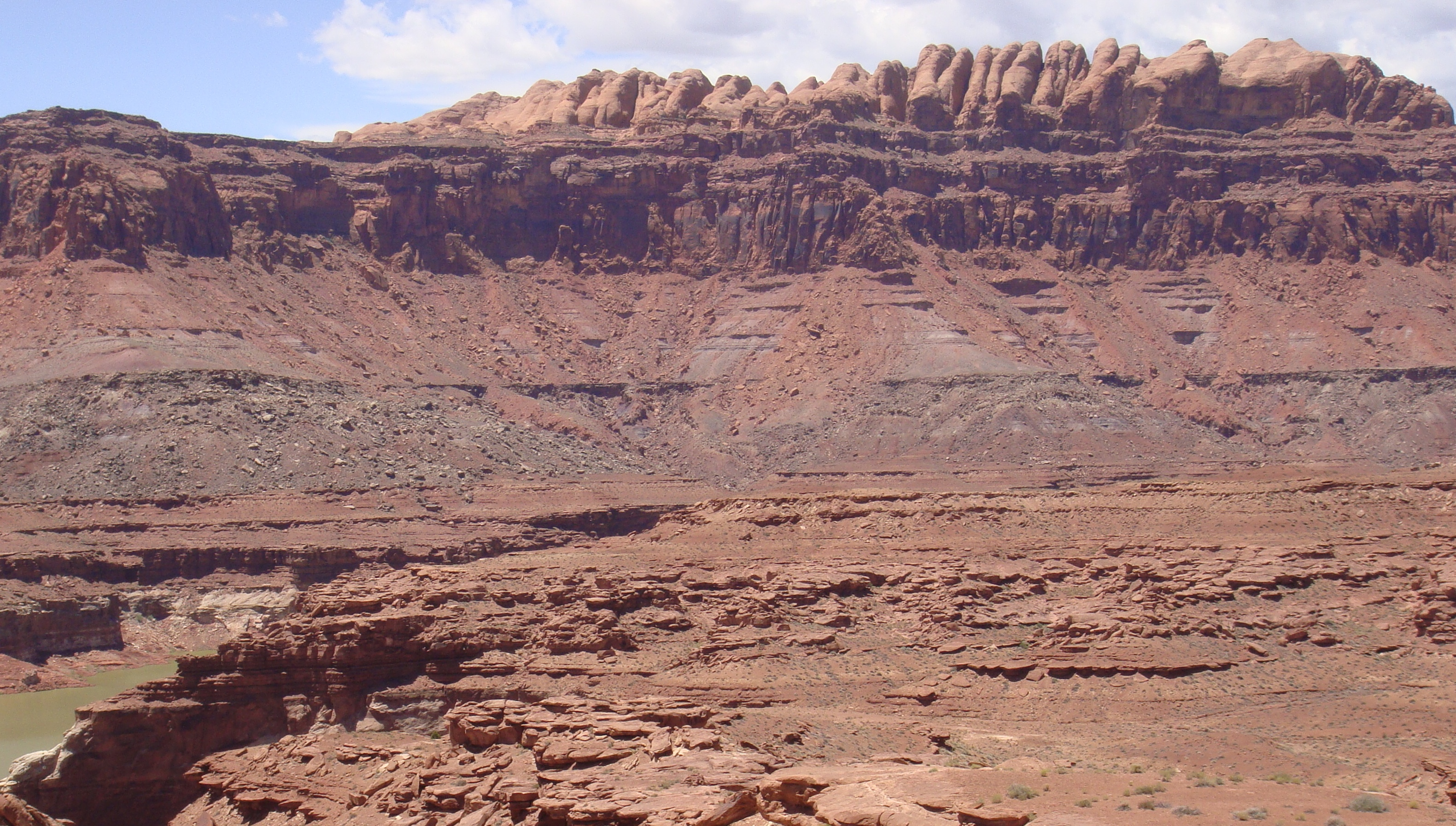
The Permian through Jurassic stratigraphy of the Colorado Plateau area of southeastern Utah that makes up much of the famous prominent rock formations in protected areas such as Capitol Reef National Park and Canyonlands National Park. From top to bottom: Rounded tan domes of the Navajo Sandstone, layered red Kayenta Formation, cliff-forming, vertically jointed, red Wingate Sandstone, slope-forming, purplish Chinle Formation, layered, lighter-red Moenkopi Formation, and white, layered Cutler Formation sandstone. Picture from Glen Canyon National Recreation Area, Utah.

Clastic red beds were laid down in shallow-water on top of the eroded Paleozoic surface early in the Triassic. These sediments were deposited on flood plains by streams on an expansive lowland that was slightly sloped in the direction of an ocean to the west. Mud built up in tidal flats to become the mudstone of Moenkopi Formation. Examples of this formation, some that still show fossilized ripple marks and mudcracks, can be seen in the northern and western parts of the park.

Another period of erosion returned, creating a third unconformity. The brightly colored shales of the slope-forming Chinle Formation were laid down on top of this eroded surface. Petrified wood from the Petrified Forest Member of the Chinle is sometimes found at the base of Chinle slopes.

=== Glen Canyon Group ===
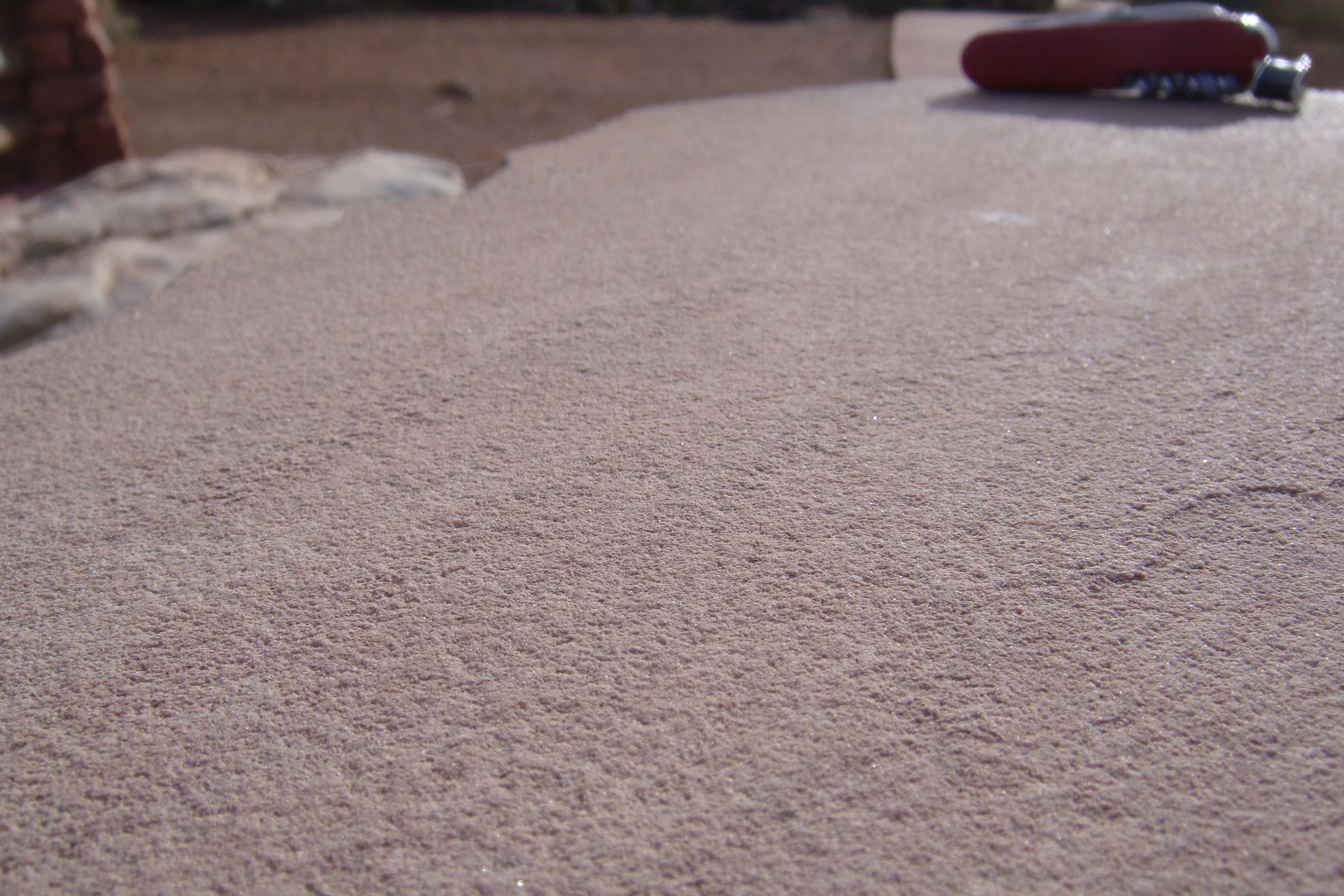
Parting lineation, from lower right to upper left; Kayenta Formation, Canyonlands National Park.

The Glen Canyon Group of formations includes (from oldest - lowest - to youngest) the

- Wingate Sandstone,
- Kayenta Formation, and the
- Navajo Sandstone

These formations are most prominently exposed in the western and northern sections of the park.

Triassic climates progressively became dryer, prompting the formation of sand dunes that buried dry stream beds and their flood plain. This sand became the cliff-forming several hundred feet (many tens of meters) high and red-colored Windgate Sandstone. Outcrops tend to run for hundreds of miles (hundreds of kilometers) with few breaks, creating an impediment to human travel.

For a time climatic conditions became wetter and streams cut channels through the sand dunes. Reddish-brown to lavender-colored sandstones interbedded with siltstones and shales constitute the resulting ledgy slope-forming Kayenta Formation.

The youngest and therefore topmost formation in the Glen Canyon Group was formed after arid conditions returned to the region. A vast and very dry desert, not unlike the modern Sahara, covered 150,000 square miles (388,000 km^{2}) of western North America. Cross bedded sand dunes accumulated to great thickness, especially in the nearby Zion and Kolob canyons area (see geology of the Zion and Kolob canyons area), forming the buff to pale orange Navajo Sandstone. Navajo outcrops form cliffs, temples, and under certain conditions natural arches (such as Millard Canyon Arch) in the area.

A fourth unconformity was created by a period of erosion.

=== San Rafael Group ===
Mud flats developed on top of the eroded surface of the Glen Canyon Group, forming the Carmel Formation. The massive cliff-forming Entrada Sandstone in turn was created on top of the Carmel. A long period of erosion stripped away most of the San Rafael Group in the area along with any formations that may have been laid down in the Cretaceous period.

== Uplift ==
Starting 70 million years ago and extending well into the Cenozoic, a mountain-building event called the Laramide orogeny uplifted the Rocky Mountains and with it the Canyonlands region. Even though the strata were uplifted thousands of feet (hundreds of meters) they were left at more-or-less the same horizontally. Uplift-associated-jointing did occur and has since influenced erosional patterns.

When ground water seeped into the salt beds of the Paradox Formation it carried away the topmost and more soluble salts, leaving gypsum. This process was so pronounced in ‘’The Grabens’’ that the overlying rock collapsed into voids left by escaping salt.

Increased precipitation during the ice ages of the Pleistocene quickened the rate of canyon excavation. Canyon widening and deepening was especially rapid for the gorges of the Green and Colorado Rivers, which were in part fed by glacier-melt from the Rocky Mountains. Alluvial-fan-creation-landslides and sand dune-migration were also accelerated in the Pleistocene. These processes continue to shape the Canyonlands landscape in the Holocene (the current epoch), but at a slower rate due to a significant increase in aridity.
