= White Rim Sandstone =

Geologic formation in Utah, United States

- Stratigraphic range: Early to Middle Permian; 275–272 Ma
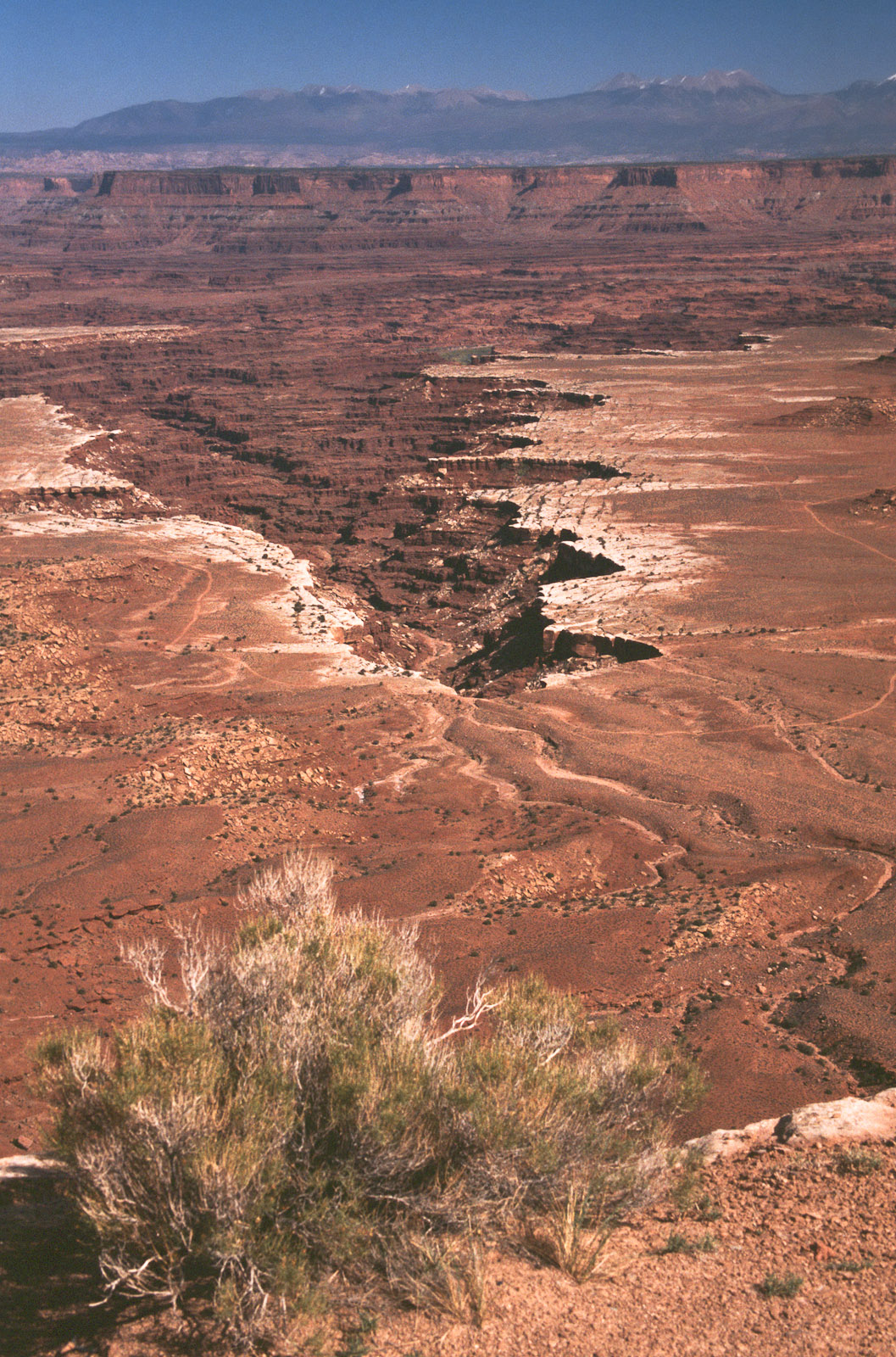
- White Rim Sandstone, Canyonlands National Park
- Type: Geological formation
- Unit of: Cutler Formation
- Underlies: Kaibab Formation, Circle Cliffs, Utah
- Overlies: Organ Rock Formation, southeast Utah; Organ Rock and Toroweap Formation, Circle Cliffs
- Thickness: 500 feet (150 m) approximate maximum

Lithology
- Primary: (white)-sandstone

Location
- Region: central & east-Colorado Plateau south and southeast Utah
- Extent: Circle Cliffs, west of Waterpocket Fold; Moab Utah region

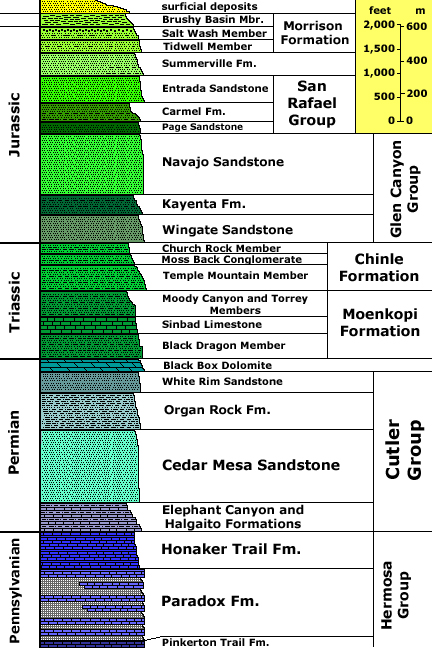

The White Rim Sandstone is a sandstone geologic formation located in southeastern Utah. It is the last member of the Permian Cutler Group, and overlies the major Organ Rock Formation and Cedar Mesa Sandstone; and again overlies thinner units of the Elephant Canyon and Halgaito Formations.

The White Rim is eponymous, as the sandstone is named for its prominent white color, and forms the rims of cliffs.

== Geology ==
It is the continental geologic formation deposited at the time of marine transgressions during the Early to Middle Permian Period.

Toroweap Formation

The coeval Toroweap Formation was laid down under marine conditions along the southwest margin of the North American continent and is found in northwest Arizona layered between Coconino Sandstone and the Kaibab Formation. The Toroweap is mostly from the Grand Canyon and just eastwards to Lee's Ferry-(Colorado River, Grand Canyon), south to the Verde Valley region (Sedona, Sycamore Canyon, Oak Creek Canyon), but the Toroweap also occurs within sections in southeast Utah, and also became overlain by the Kaibab Formation, specifically at the Circle Cliffs, west of the Waterpocket Fold.

== Geography ==
The White Rim Sandstone typically occurs above the Organ Rock Formation in southeast Utah, which sits upon the extensive Cedar Mesa Sandstone in southeast Utah.

=== Occurrences in Utah ===
Moab, Utah, is located in southeast Utah, about 25 miles (40 km) west of the Colorado border. The Circle Cliffs lie about 90 miles (145 km) southwest from Moab, and east of Escalante and Boulder, Utah (Utah State Route 12). The Circle Cliffs are located in the northeast of Grand Staircase–Escalante National Monument. The cliffs also extend north-northwest adjacent the west perimeter of the Waterpocket Fold, Capitol Reef National Park. The fold is traversed by Burr Trail Road-Straton Road which has views toward the Circle Cliffs, southward, or westward.

The White Rim Road traverses the White Rim Sandstone formation between the base of the Island in the Sky mesa and the Colorado and Green Rivers within Canyonlands National Park.

- Circle Cliffs, (extreme south)-southeast-Utah
  - Moenkopi Formation
  - Toroweap Formation-White Rim Sandstone
  - Organ Rock Formation
  - Cedar Mesa Sandstone
- Moab, Utah — W. Colorado
  - Moenkopi Formation
  - White Rim Sandstone
  - Organ Rock Formation
  - Cedar Mesa Sandstone

== See also ==
- Geology of the Canyonlands area
- Geology of the Zion and Kolob canyons area

== Gallery ==
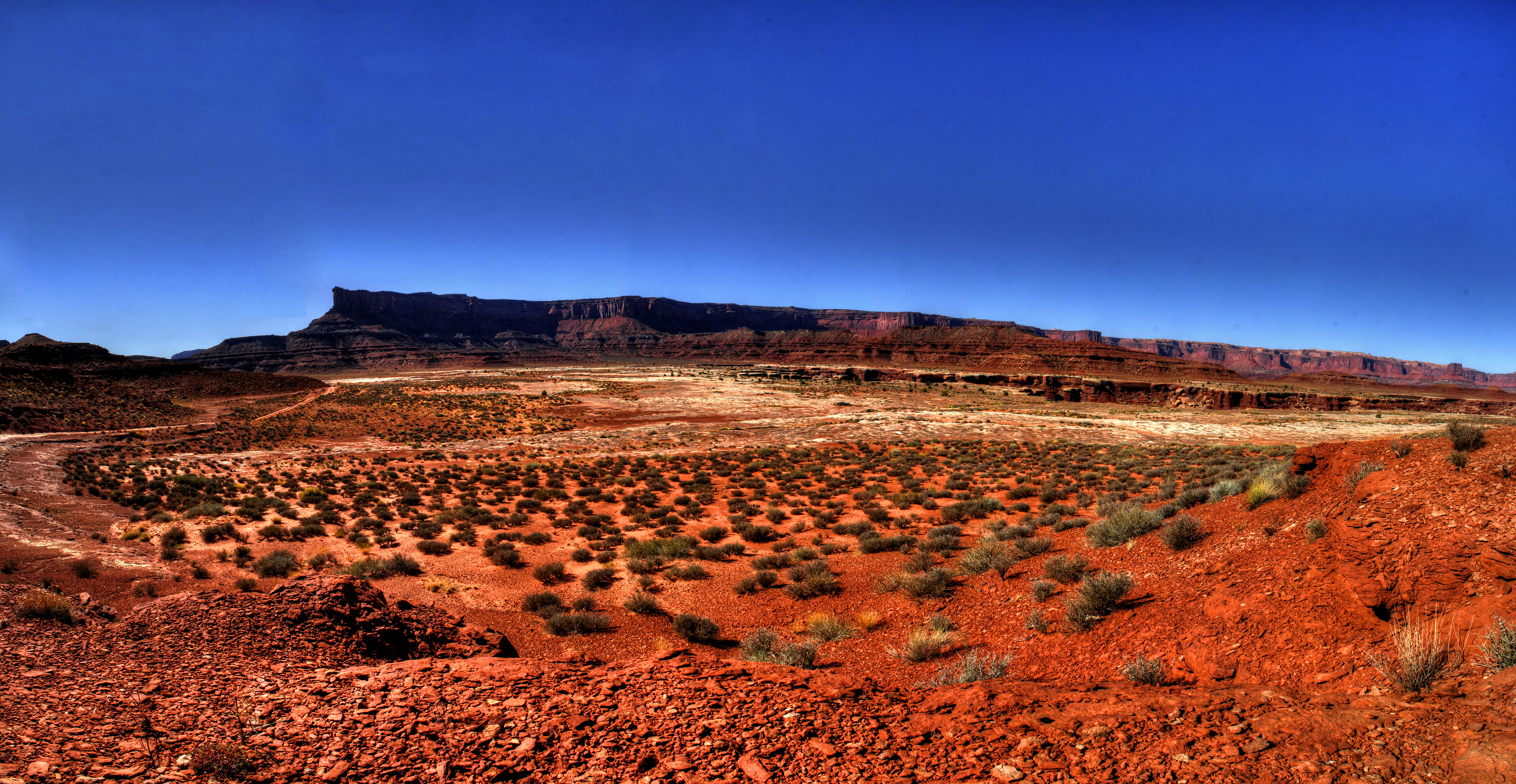
White Rim Road, Canyonlands National Park

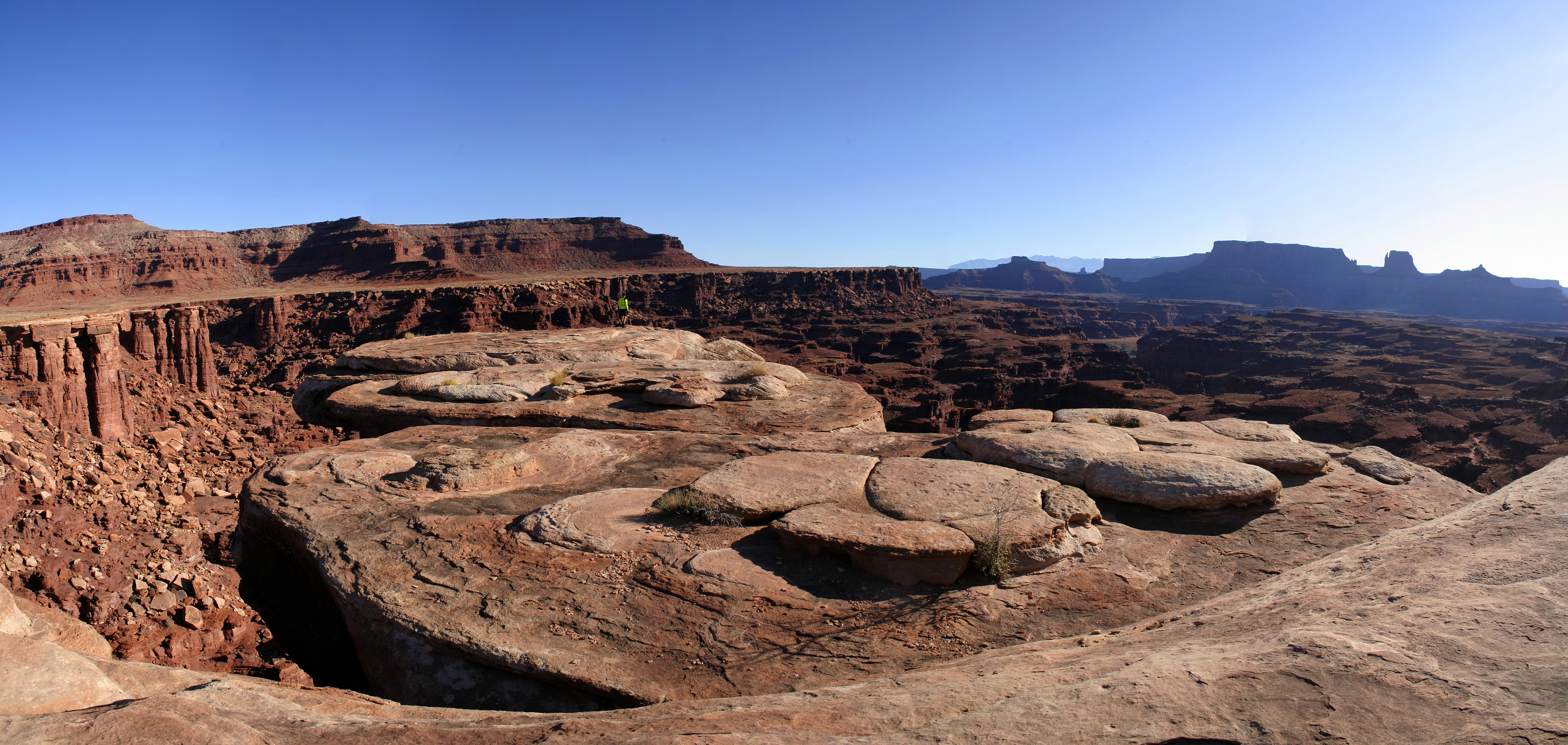
White Rim Sandstone, Canyonlands National Park

=== White Rim & Organ Rock ===
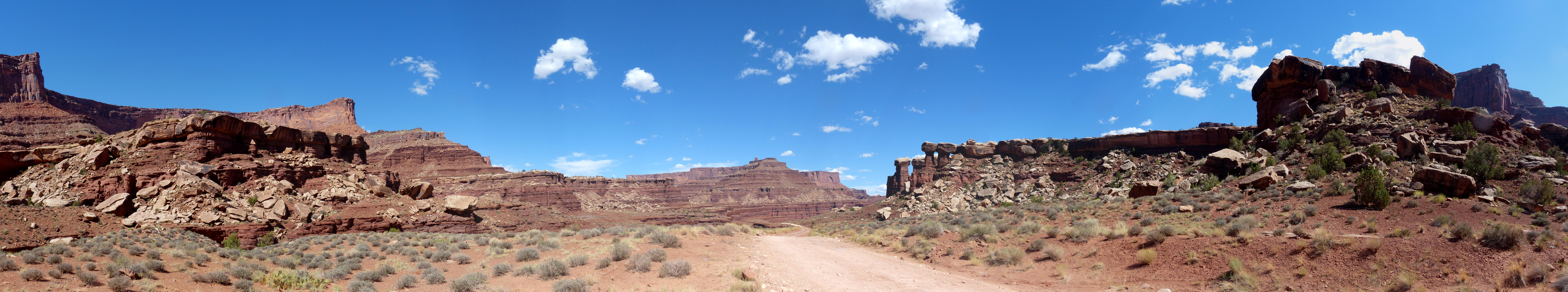
Debris of White Rim Sandstone on dark red-brown Organ Rock Formation, In foreground & distance up valley
