= Honaker Trail =

Hiking trail in Utah, United States

Coordinates: 37°11′35″N 109°57′03″W

- Length: 2.5 mi (4.0 km)
- Location: San Juan County, Utah
- Use: Hiking
- Elevation change: 1,210 ft (370 m)
- Highest point: Canyon rim, 5,160 ft (1,570 m)
- Lowest point: San Juan River, 4,150 ft (1,260 m)

The Honaker Trail is a hiking trail located near Goosenecks State Park in southeastern Utah. Built in the late 1890s and early 1900s as a supply route for gold prospectors, the 2.5-mile (4.0 km) trail connects the deeply entrenched San Juan River with the canyon rim over 1,200 feet (370 m) above. Popular with geologists, the trail serves as the type locality for the Pennsylvanian Honaker Trail Formation. Fossilized crinoids and brachiopods, as well as trace fossils of other organisms are visible along portions of the trail.
