= Druid Arch =

Cedar Mesa Sandstone arch in San Juan County, Utah

- Rock arch
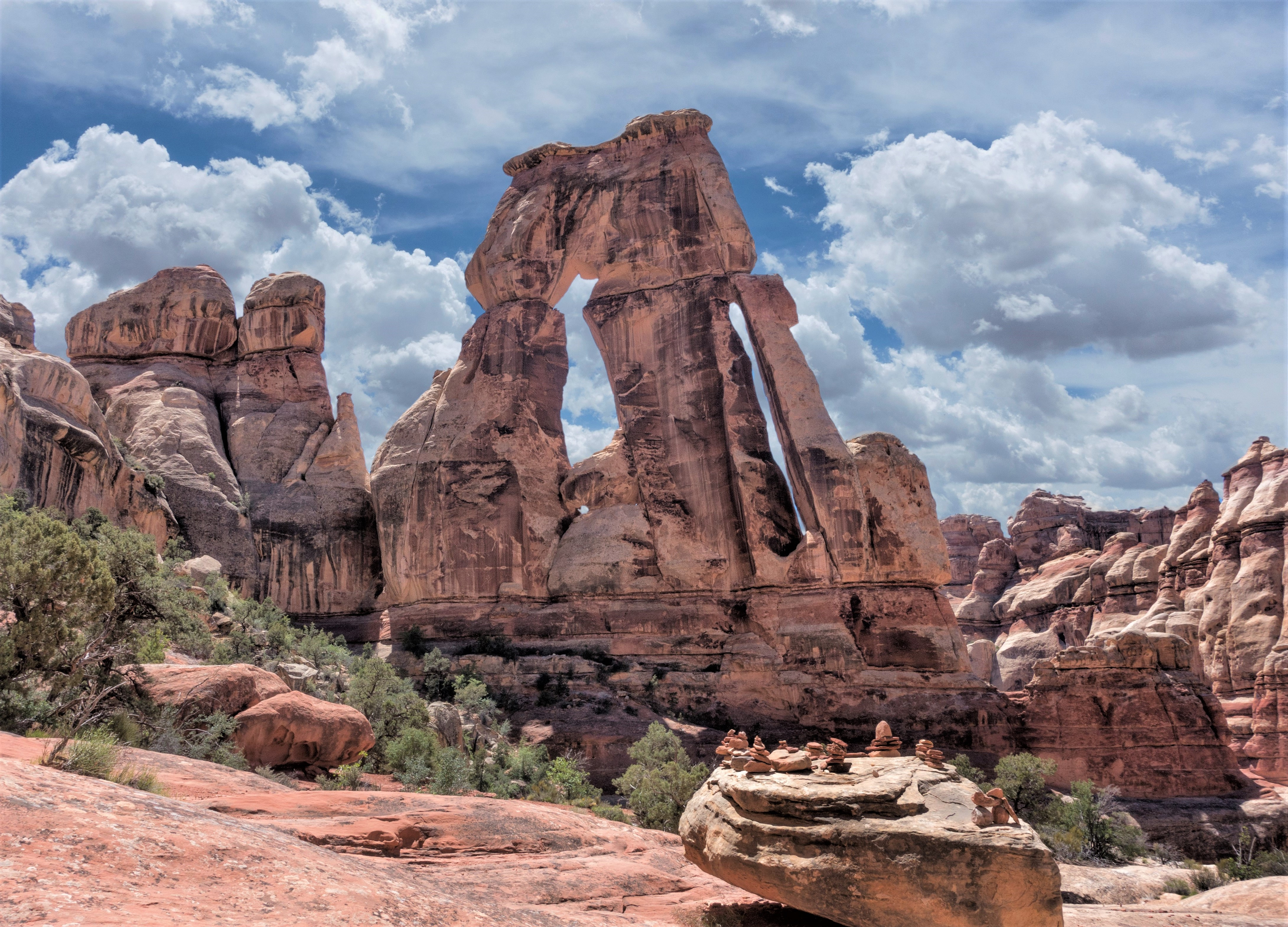
- Druid Arch, east aspect

- Location within Utah Location within the United States
- Coordinates: 38°05′18″N 109°49′59″W
- Location: Canyonlands National Park; San Juan County, Utah, U.S.
- Age: Permian
- Geology: Cedar Mesa Sandstone

Dimensions
  - Height: 150 ft (46 m)
- Elevation: 1,723 m (5,653 ft)
- Topo map: USGS Druid Arch

Druid Arch is an iconic 150-foot tall Cedar Mesa Sandstone arch located within the Needles District of Canyonlands National Park, in San Juan County, Utah. It is situated at the head of Elephant Canyon, and precipitation runoff from Druid Arch drains north into the nearby Colorado River via Elephant Canyon. Druid Arch is one of the most popular hiking destinations in the Needles district. A 5.4 mile hike to Druid Arch starts at the Elephant Hill Trailhead, and the final quarter-mile is steep with some scrambling and one ladder. The name comes from its resemblance to the Stonehenge monument in England, which is believed to be a Druid temple. This feature's name was officially adopted in 1963 by the U.S. Board on Geographic Names.

== Geology ==
This geological feature is an eroded fin composed of Cedar Mesa Sandstone, which is the remains of coastal sand dunes deposited about 245–286 million years ago, during the early Permian period. The top of the formation rises 450 feet above the canyon floor, and two keyhole openings have a height of 85 feet, and a width of 20 feet.

== Climate ==
Spring and fall are the most favorable seasons to experience Druid Arch. According to the Köppen climate classification system, it is located in a Cold semi-arid climate zone, which is defined by the coldest month having an average mean temperature below −0 °C (32 °F) and at least 50% of the total annual precipitation being received during the spring and summer. This desert climate receives less than 10 inches (250 millimeters) of annual rainfall, and snowfall is generally light during the winter.

== Gallery ==
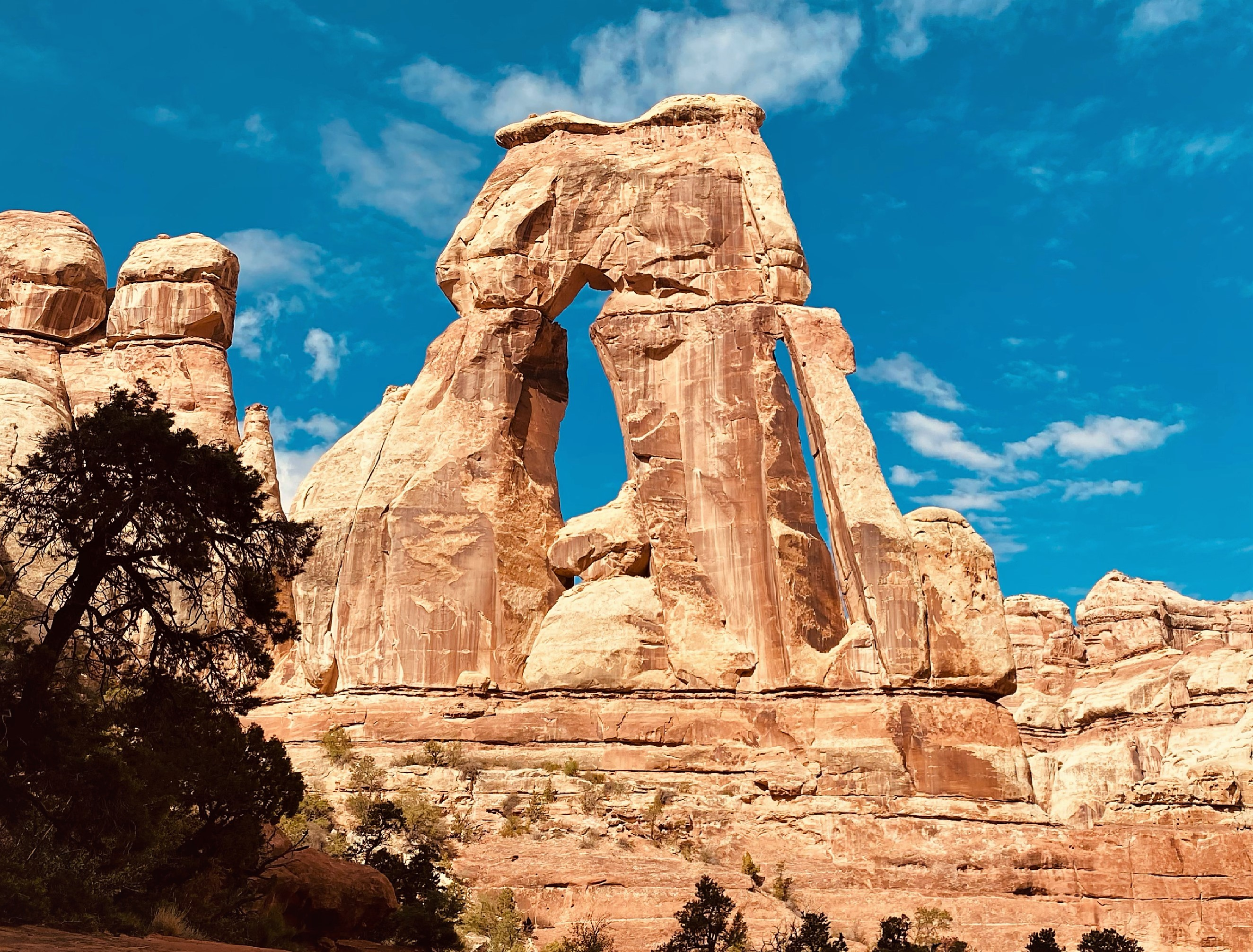
East aspect

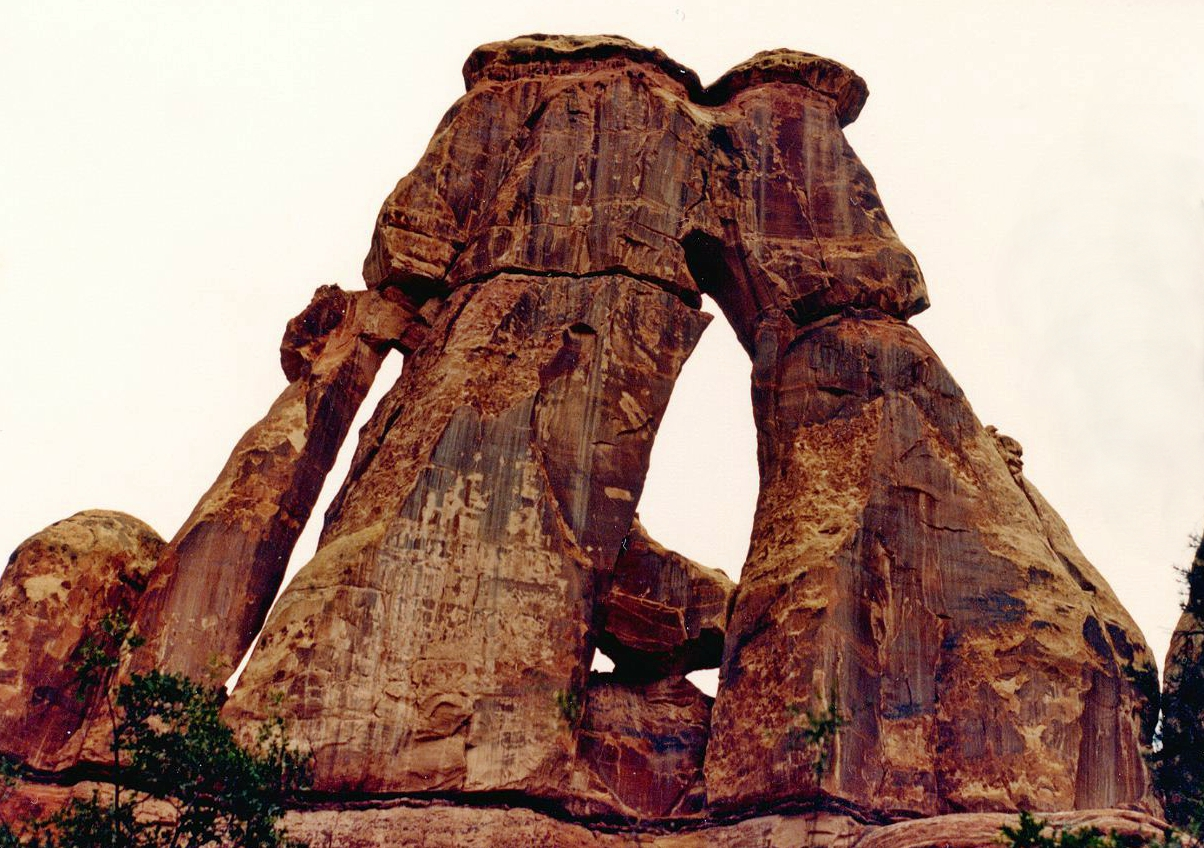
West aspect

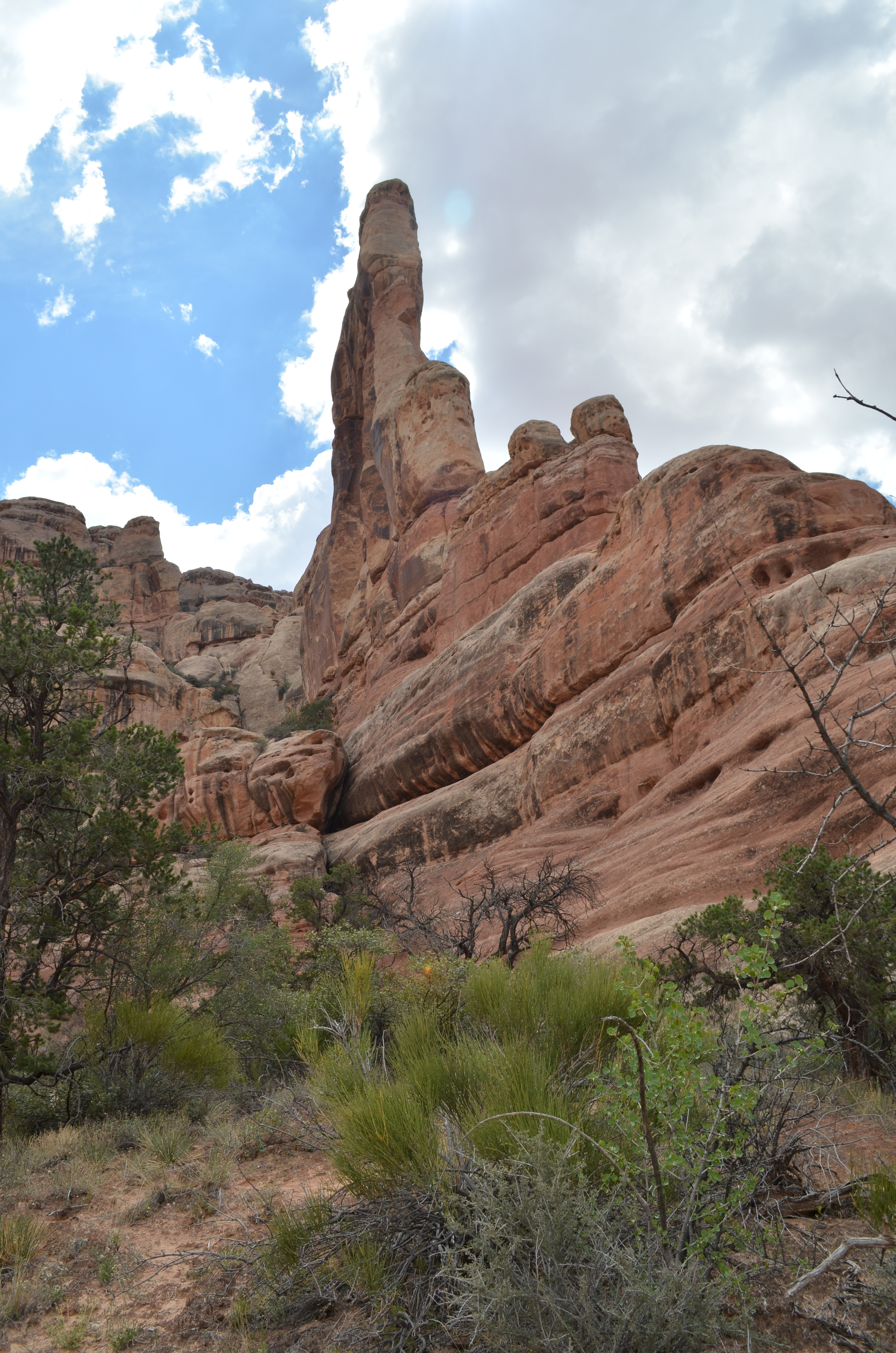
edgewise from north

== See also ==
- Colorado Plateau
- Geology of Utah
