= Cutler Formation =

Geologic formation in the Four Corners, US

- Stratigraphic range: Wolfcampian to Leonardian
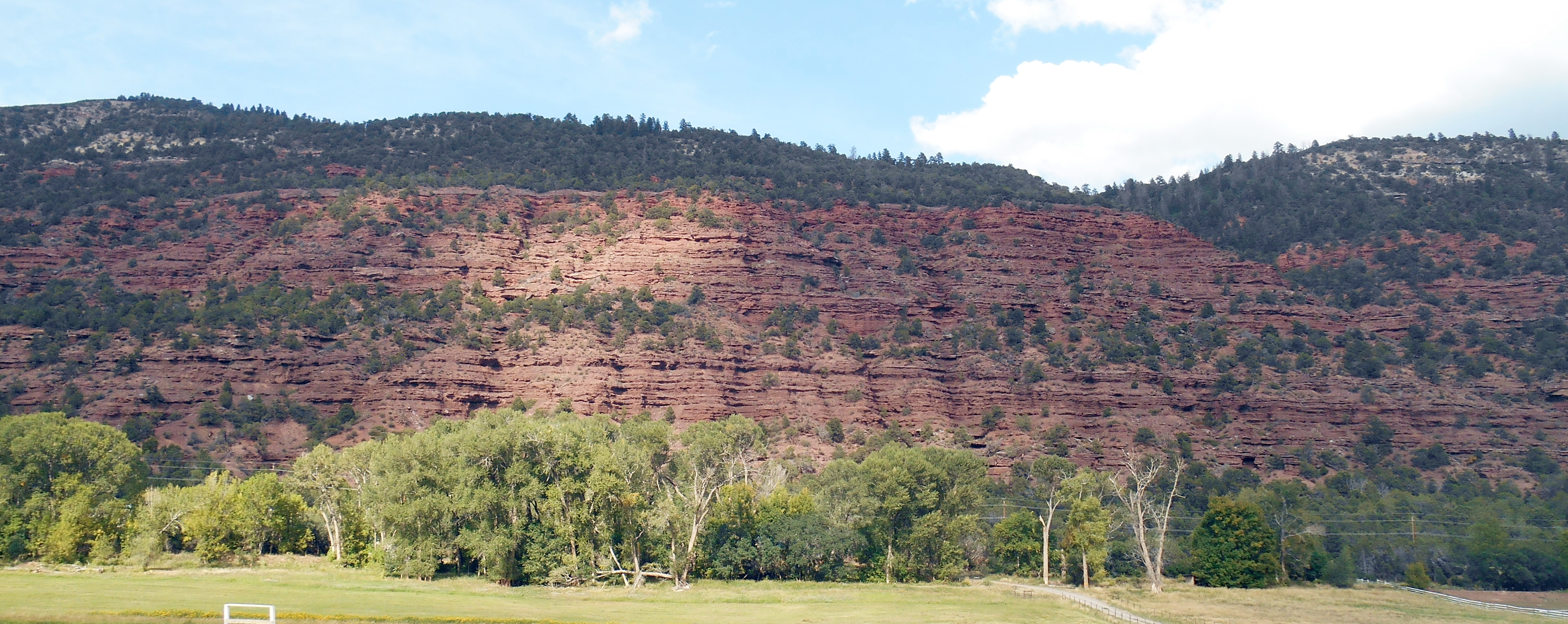
- Cutler Formation near the type locality, Portland, Ouray County, Colorado
- Type: Geological formation
- Sub-units: De Chelly Sandstone, White Rim Sandstone, Organ Rock Shale, Cedar Mesa Sandstone, Elephant Canyon Formation, Halgaito Shale
- Underlies: Chinle Formation; Moenkopi Formation
- Overlies: Hermosa Group
- Thickness: over 1,000 feet (300 m)

Lithology
- Primary: Iron-rich arkose sandstone

Location
- Coordinates: 38.096°N 107.702°W
- Approximate paleocoordinates: 0.7°N 36.1°W
- Region: Colorado Plateau
- Country: United States
- Extent: Arizona; Colorado; New Mexico; Utah

Type section
- Named for: Cutler Creek, north of Ouray, Co
- Named by: Cross & Howe
- Year defined: 1905
- Cutler Formation (the United States) Cutler Formation (Colorado)

The Cutler Formation or Cutler Group is a stratigraphic unit exposed across the U.S. states of Arizona, northwest New Mexico, southeast Utah and southwest Colorado. It was laid down in the Early Permian during the Wolfcampian epoch.

== Description ==
At its type area north of Ouray, Colorado, the Cutler Formation consists of over 1,000 feet (300 m) of bright red sandstone, siltstone, and conglomerate beds alternating with reddish mudstone or clay-rich limestone. Further west, the unit shows great lithological diversity, and can be divided into easily recognizable mappable subunits. Here the Cutler is raised from formation to group rank and its subunits are themselves designated as formations. The unit in its type area remains at formation rank and is often described as the "undifferentiated Cutler".

The formation overlies the Hermosa Group and is in turn overlain by either the Dolores Formation (near its type area) or the Moenkopi Formation (further west). It is laterally equivalent to the Abo Formation of central New Mexico, to which it seamlessly transitions in the Jemez Mountains.

The formation has been dated to Wolfcampian near its type area. At this point in geologic time, the Uncompahgre Uplift of the Ancestral Rocky Mountains was still rising along an arc from eastern Utah through southwestern Colorado and into northern New Mexico. Tremendous quantities of sediment were eroded off the uplift and accumulated at its southwest margin to form the undifferentiated Cutler, which in some places reached a thickness of 8,000 feet (2,400 m). Further west, eolian (wind), fluvial (river) and marine influences became important and produced the lithological variety of the Cutler Group.

The undifferentiated Cutler consists of alluvial fan deposits in a narrow belt very close to the Uncompahgre Uplift, and fluvial deposits further out. The coarsest exposures are near Gateway, Colorado, within a mile of the thrust fault defining the southwest margin of the ancient Uncompahgre Uplift. Some granite boulders in these deposits are up to 25 feet (7.6 m) in diameter. However, thrusting along the uplift margin had ceased by the time the youngest beds were deposited. Further west, the formation transitions to thin (less than 1 foot (0.30 m)) sandstone and conglomerate beds, in which the grains become finer towards the top of the bed (a fining upward sequence). These are interpreted as recording individual sheet flood events.

=== Subunits ===
The Cutler has been placed at either formation or group stratigraphic rank, depending on the publication. Its subunits, therefore, are variously called formations or members. Subunits on the Colorado Plateau are:

- De Chelly Sandstone (Arizona, Colorado, New Mexico, Utah) — youngest
- White Rim Sandstone (Utah)
- Organ Rock Shale (Arizona, Colorado, New Mexico, Utah)
- Cedar Mesa Sandstone (Arizona, Utah)
- lower Cutler beds (Arizona, Colorado, New Mexico, Utah) — oldest

Beds formerly assigned to the Elephant Canyon Formation, the Halgaito Shale, or the Rico Formation are included in the lower Cutler beds.

The stratigraphy of the lower Cutler beds has long been controversial. Charles Whitman Cross and A.C. Spencer applied the name Rico Formation to beds in the Rico Mountains of southwestern Colorado that were transitional from the marine Hermosa Formation and the overlying continental Cutler Formation. These contained marine fossils suggesting the beds covered the Pennsylvanian to Permian time interval. The name came into wide use for transitional beds further west as petroleum geologists mapped the Colorado Plateau. However, the definition of the Rico was vague and it was mapped inconsistently in the region. This led Don Baars to recommend abandoning the Rico in favor of placing the upper, Permian beds in his new Elephant Canyon Formation and reassigning the lower, Pennsylvanian, beds to the underlying Honaker Trail Formation. However, other geologists objected to this because the contact was defined by the fusulinids present in the beds, which made this a chronostratigraphic rather than a lithostratigraphic distinction, and by a subtle angular unconformity that was not easily recognized in the field. This led to abandonment of the Elephant Canyon Formation and designation of all beds between the Honaker Trail Formation and the Cedar Mesa Sandstone as simply the lower Cutler beds. These also include beds previously assigned to the Halgaito Formation.

In the Chama Basin of New Mexico, the Cutler Group has been divided into two formations:

- Arroyo del Agua Formation — younger
- El Cobre Canyon Formation — older

A sandstone unit resembling the De Chelly Sandstone is present above the Arroyo del Agua Formation in the southernmost part of the basin, but in this region it is assigned to the Yeso Group.

== Extent ==
Cutler outcrops are found in these geologic locations in Arizona, Colorado, New Mexico and Utah.

- Black Mesa Basin
- Paradox Basin
- Piceance Basin
- San Juan Mountains province
- San Juan Basin
- Uinta Basin

== History of investigation ==
There is no designated type locality for the Cutler. It was named by Charles Whitman Cross and Ernest Howe in 1905 after Cutler Creek, which enters Uncompahgre River about 4 miles north of Ouray, Colorado. They found that nonfossiliferous red beds provisionally assigned to the Dolores Formation were separated from overlying fossiliferous Triassic beds by a significant angular unconformity. The lower beds were tentatively identified as Permian beds, and were removed from the Dolores Formation to the newly designated Cutler Formation.

Baker and Reeside revised Cross and Howe's work in 1929, tracing the Cutler across the Colorado Plateau and dividing the formation into the Halgaito Tongue, Cedar Mesa Sandstone Member, Organ Rock Tongue, and White Rim Sandstone Member. They also confirmed Cross and Howe's dating of the formation to the Permian. The Cutler was traced through the Jemez Mountains and found to be laterally equivalent to the Abo Formation by Wood and Northrop in 1946.

In 1958, Wengerd and Matheny raised the formation to group rank.

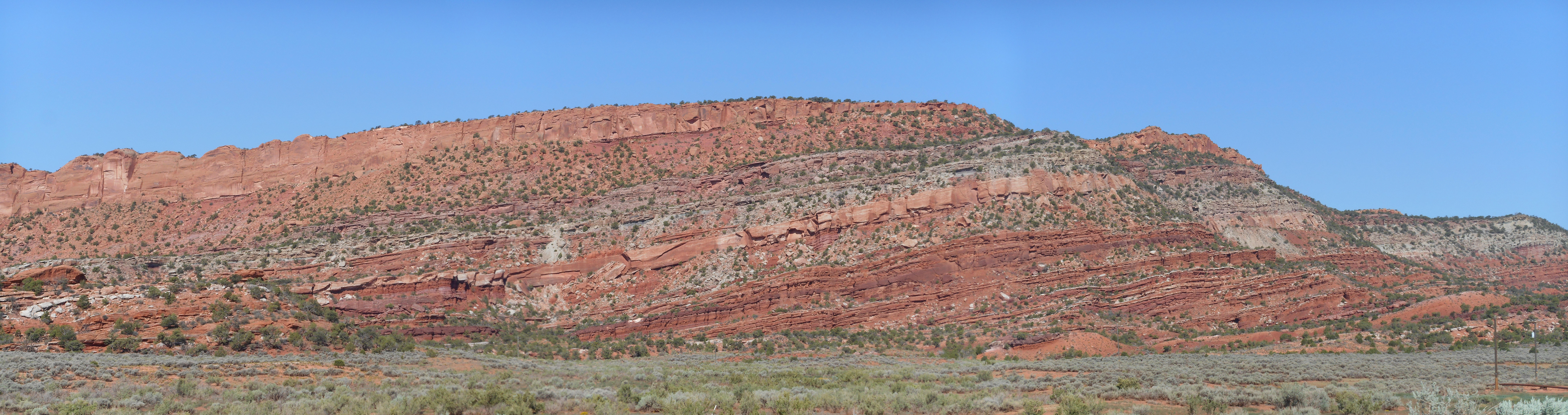
Cutler and Chinle formations in Lisbon Valley, San Juan County, Utah

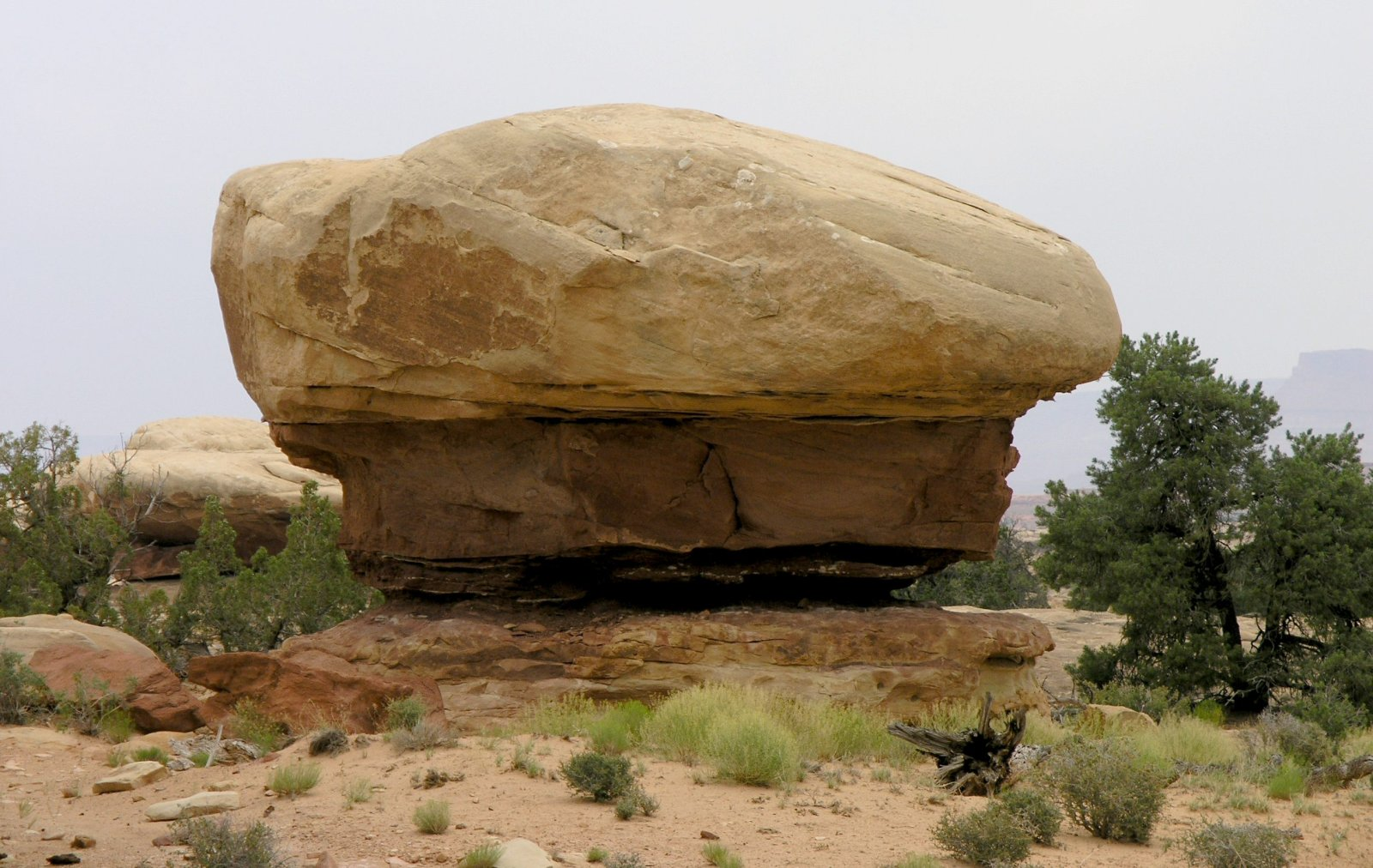
Cedar Mesa Sandstone overlaying Organ Rock Shale, Canyonlands, Utah
