= Organ Rock Formation =

Geologic formation in the United States

- Stratigraphic range: Early to Middle Permian: 290–272 Ma
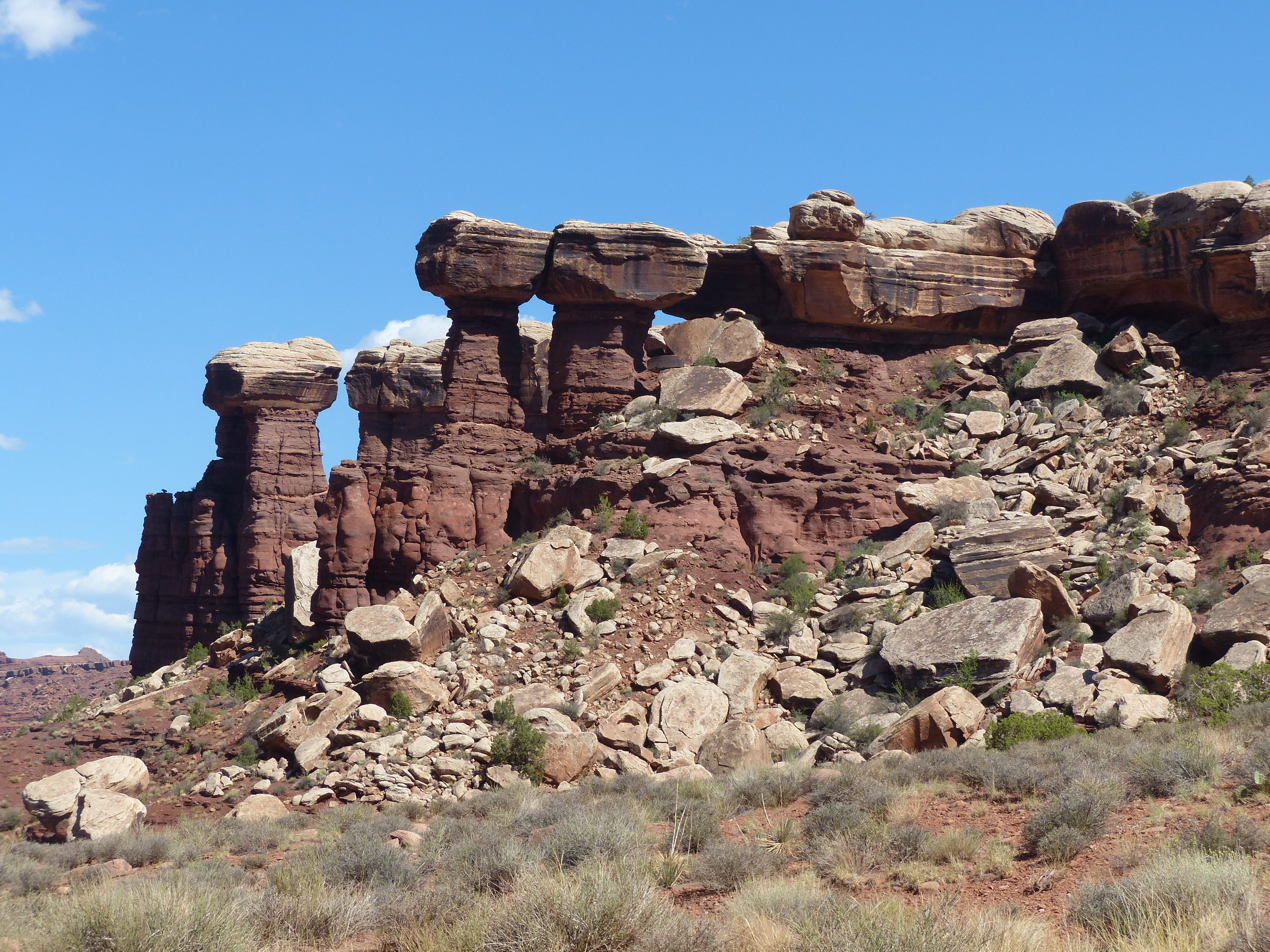
- Towers of red Organ Rock capped with White Rim Sandstone in Shafer Canyon in Canyonlands National Park
- Type: Geological formation
- Unit of: Cutler Formation
- Underlies: De Chelly Sandstone
- Overlies: Cedar Mesa Sandstone

Lithology
- Primary: sandstones, siltstones, conglomerates, and mudstones.

Location
- Coordinates: 37.124°N 110.378°W
- Region: Colorado Plateau
- Extent: Utah, Colorado, Arizona, New Mexico
- Organ Rock Formation (the United States) Organ Rock Formation (Utah)

The Organ Rock Formation or Organ Rock Shale is a formation within the late Pennsylvanian to early Permian Cutler Group and is deposited across southeastern Utah, northwestern New Mexico, and northeastern Arizona. This formation notably outcrops around Canyonlands National Park, Natural Bridges National Monument, and Monument Valley of northeast Arizona, southern Utah. The age of the Organ Rock is constrained to the latter half of the Cisuralian epoch by age dates from overlying and underlying formations. Important early terrestrial vertebrate fossils have been recovered from this formation in northern Arizona, southern Utah, and northern New Mexico. These include the iconic Permian terrestrial fauna: Seymouria, Diadectes, Ophiacodon, and Dimetrodon. The fossil assemblage present suggests arid environmental conditions. This is corroborated with paleoclimate data indicative of global drying throughout the early Permian.

== Geographic extent ==
The Organ Rock Formation is present across southeastern Utah, U.S.A. It outcrops around Canyonlands National Park, Natural Bridges National Monument, and Monument Valley. In these areas the Organ Rock typically outcrops as a dark-red/brown siltstone to mudstone gently dipping towards the southeast. Within Canyonlands N.P. it forms towers which are meters to tens of meters tall. These are protected by caps of the White Rim Sandstone. In general, the Organ Rock Formation records the evolution of terminal fluvial fans, which dry up into sections of overlying formations. Animals living during the time of the Organ Rock's deposition had the capacity to travel across most of earth's landmass, as at the time, land was all concentrated into the supercontinent Pangea.

== Stratigraphy and age ==
The Organ Rock Formation is conformably underlain by the Cedar Mesa Sandstone. It is conformably overlain by the De Chelly Sandstone around Monument Valley and by the White Rim Sandstone in the Canyonlands National Park. In locations where the De Chelly and White Rim are absent, the Organ Rock is unconformably overlain by the Triassic Moenkopi or Chinle Formations by an erosional contact. Toward its eastern extent, the Organ Rock Formation grades into the Cutler Formation, undivided. This transition occurs to the southwest of Moab, UT. The age of the Organ Rock Formation is unconfirmed. The preceding Cedar Mesa Sandstone is dated to the Wolfcampian (ICS stage: Artinskian). The anteceding De Chelly and White Rim Sandstones are dated to the Leonardian (ICS stage: Kungurian). These formations constrain the age of the Organ Rock Formation to the latter part of the Cisuralian Epoch, approximately 290.1 to 272.3 Ma. The Organ Rock Formation may contain the Artinskian/Kungurian boundary. This is during the early to mid-Permian, a time where synapsids and temnospondyl amphibians are the dominant players in terrestrial ecosystems. These animals predate the advent of archosaur reptiles which give rise to dinosaurs in the Triassic.

== Depositional environments ==
The Organ Rock Formation is composed of sandstones, siltstones, conglomerates, and mudstones. These rocks occur in two primary facies: floodplain and channel, as well as eolian dunes and sand sheets.

=== Floodplain and channel ===
In these deposits, mixed reddish-brown sands and silts dominate with minor mudstones and conglomerates interspersed. Interpreted channel deposits grade from laterally accreting coarse sands – into conglomerates of pebble-sized carbonate clasts. Channels are 0.5 meter to 7 meters thick and may extend laterally for a few hundred meters. Fine-grained silt to mudstone deposits are proximal to interpreted channels. These deposits are interpreted as meandering streams with associated floodplains.

=== Eolian dune and sand sheet ===
Deposits are characterized by pale red fine- to medium-grained sandstones. These units are cross-bedded. Each cross-bed is composed of thin, consistently spaced laminations. These strata are interpreted as those made by migrating dunes. This facies is marked by a sharp contact at the top of the preceding floodplain and channel facies. Mud cracks found at the top of the facies are filled by fine-grained sand from the overlying dune facies. This facies is most common at the western extent of the Organ Rock Formation.

== Plant fossils ==
Plant fossils include Supaia, Walchi and Yakia which lived in semi-arid conditions.

== Vertebrate fossils ==
Fossil vertebrates represent the majority of the faunal assemblage present in the Organ Rock Formation. Animal remains are most commonly preserved within ancient stream channels of the floodplain and channel facies. Within this facies, fossilized bone occurs proximal to conglomeratic lenses. Taxa recovered include: freshwater actinopterygian fishes, temnospondyl amphibians, diadectomorphs, seymouriamorphs, and early synapsids.

=== Freshwater Actinopterygian fishes ===
Fossil fish material, either bone or scale, is infrequent within the Organ Rock Formation. Scales from the extinct group of fishes Palaeoniscoidea are present. These scales, however, are only found preserved in fossilized feces (coprolites). Some coprolites are interpreted to be from fish; others from indeterminate terrestrial vertebrates.

=== Temnospondyls ===
Temnospondyl amphibian remains are present within the Organ Rock Formation. Three taxa have been reported. These include: Trimerorhachis, Eryops, and Zatrachys. Of these three taxa, fragments of Eryops are the most commonly recovered. Remains of this animal are very common in other formations of the Cutler Group and in general during the Early Permian of southwestern North America.

=== Diadectomorphs ===
Diadectomorphs are medium to large (2–3 meters), heavily-built reptiliomorphs with robust limbs. These animals are thought to be the closest outgroup to the clade Amniota. Two taxa are present within the Organ Rock Formation: Diadectes, and Tseajaia campi. Diadectes is more abundant in the Organ Rock than the other formations of the Cutler Group. Fragments of the animal are most commonly reported. The most complete two specimens include pectoral girdles and limbs. These were collected in San Juan County, Utah. Diadectes is an important animal as it is the first terrestrial vertebrate to demonstrate characteristics necessary for obligatory herbivory. These include: peg-shaped teeth in the front of the mouth, as well as broad blunt teeth used to more effectively process vegetation. Tseajaia campi is a very rare taxon known from one nearly complete specimen recovered from the Organ Rock. Originally described by Vaughn, this animal was first assigned to the group Seymouriamorpha, however, upon reassessment of the holotype it was demonstrated to have a closer affinity to Diadectomorpha.

=== Seymouriamorphs ===
Seymouriamorphs are small- to medium- sized (0.5 to 1.5 meters), reptiliomorphs. These animals have a generalized early amphibian body plan with a large “u”-shaped head and a sprawling lizard-like posture. The taxon Seymouria sanjuanensis is the only seymouriamorph found in the Organ Rock Formation. Seymouria sanjuanensis is a unique taxon because of its extensive geographic range. This particular animal was first described by Vaughn (1966) from the Organ Rock Formation. Since this initial find, a number of these individuals have been recovered from localities as distant as Germany.

=== Early Synapsids ===
Four early synapsid taxa are present within the Organ Rock Formation. These include Ophiacodon, as well as three sphenacodontids: Ctenospondylus, Dimetrodon, and Sphenacodon ferocior. Most taxa are known from fragmentary material. Early synapsids were dominant members of the terrestrial Permian ecosystem. Some early synapsids adapted an herbivorous diet, however, the Organ Rock Formation only preserves carnivorous animals; these were likely the apex predators of this ecosystem. The three sphenacodontids were terrestrial predators consuming other tetrapods, while Ophiacodon likely hunted fishes and other aquatic animals.

=== Coprolites ===
Coprolites associated with a labyrinthodont tooth as well as “Pelycosaur” and didectid remains have been recovered from this formation.

== Paleoecological significance ==
The vertebrate faunal assemblage found in the Organ Rock Formation is diverse with respect to taxonomic groups, body plans, and diets. This material represents a decent cross-section of what terrestrial vertebrate life was like during the early Permian. It is noteworthy that no diapsid material has been definitively recovered from this formation. As one moves younger in time through the Organ Rock Formation, temnospondyls become less abundant with respect to other major groups such as diadectomorphs and early synapsids. This could track the general trend of aridification as indicated by sedimentology of the formation. This trend is globally recognized during the Early Permian, supported by many lines of geologic evidence including significant deposits of calcretes, eolianites, and evaporites.

== External links and Gallery ==
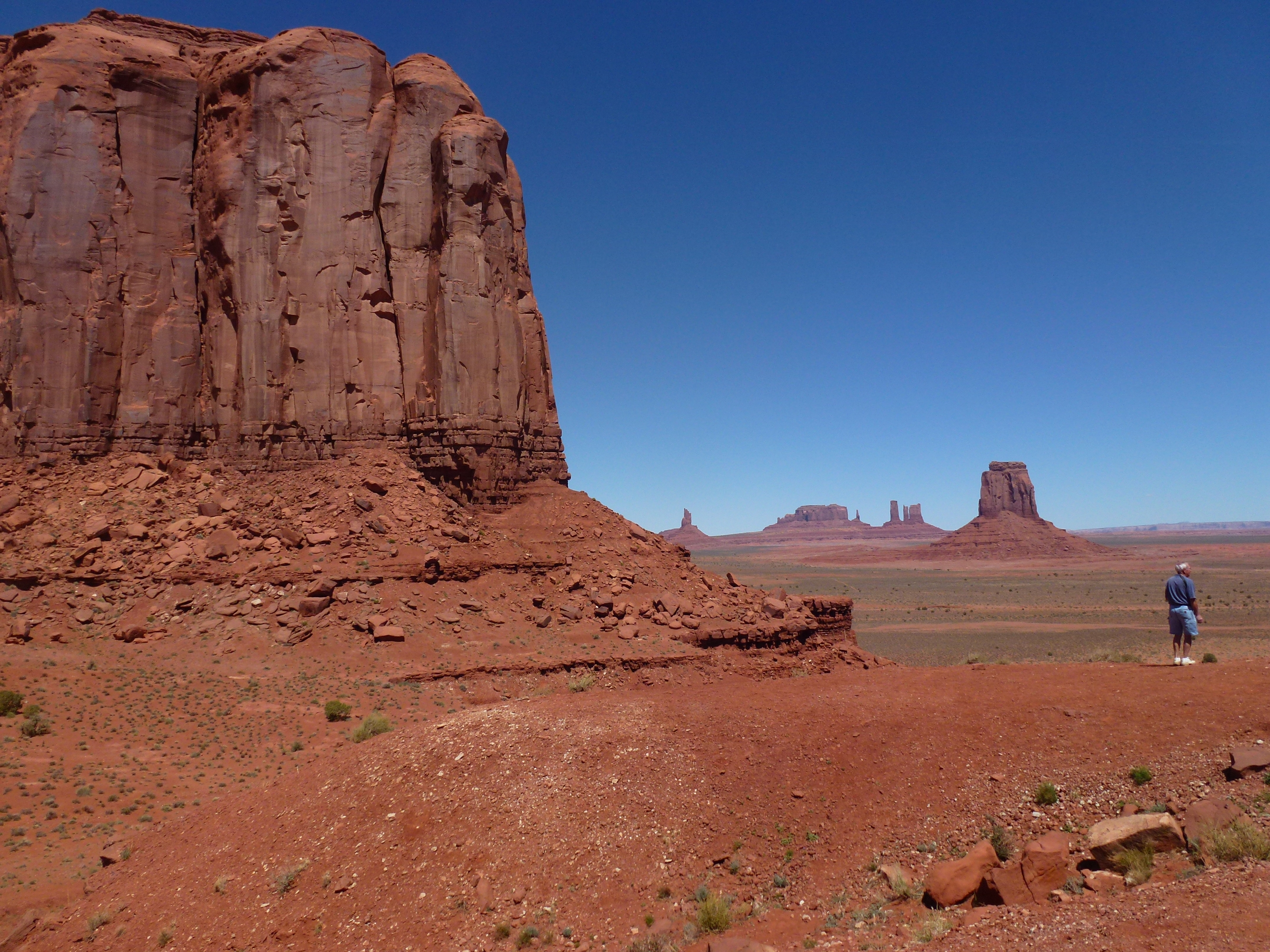
Typical Organ Rock angled skirts,
below De Chelly Sandstone,
Monument Valley

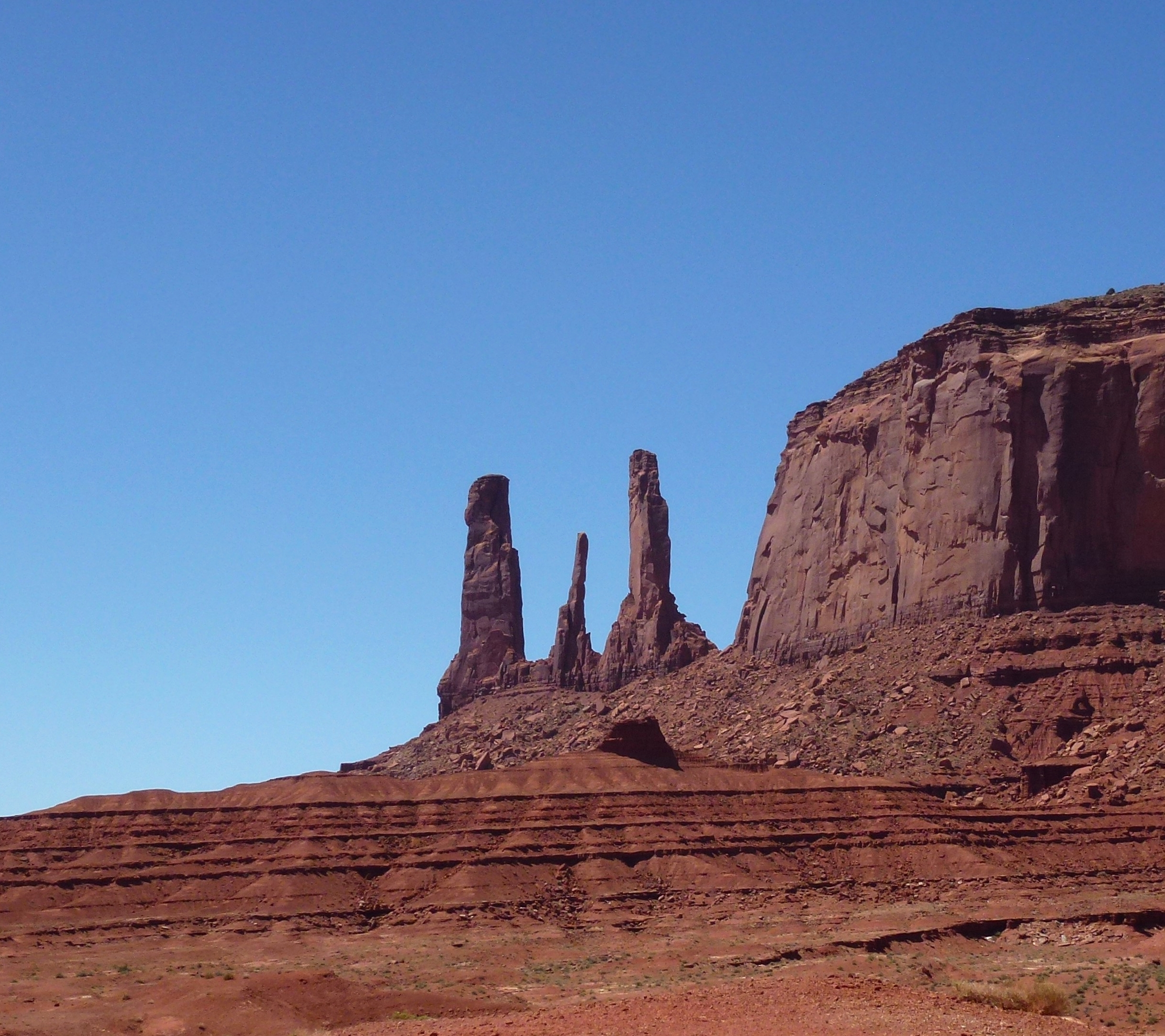
Angled skirts of Organ Rock,
at base of De Chelly Sandstone vertical massive cliffs
