= Goosenecks State Park =

State park in Utah, United States

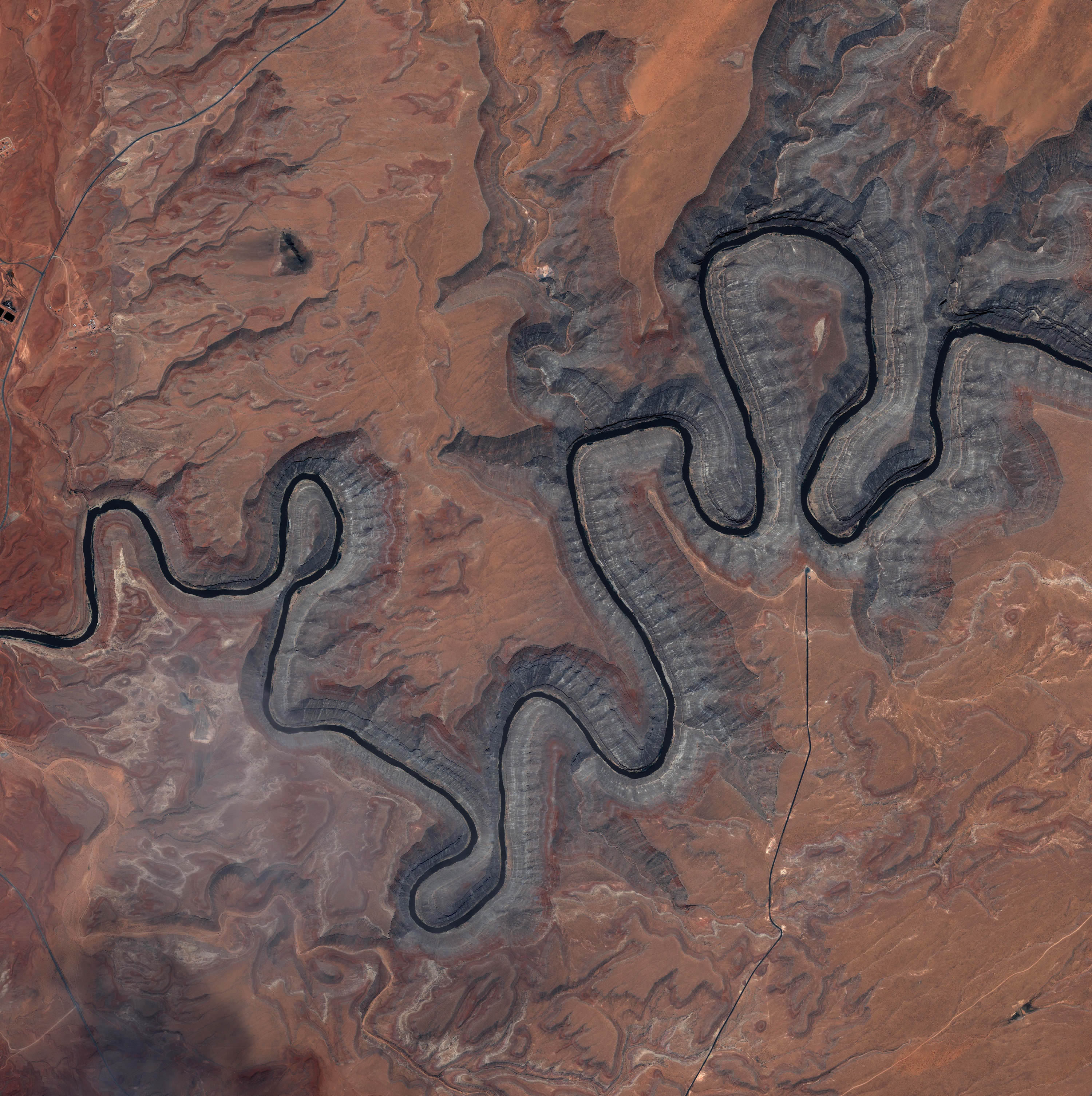
- Satellite photo of Goosenecks State Park, 2004

- Location within Utah Location within the United States
- Interactive map of Goosenecks State Park
- Location: San Juan County, Utah, United States
- Coordinates: 37°10′29″N 109°55′37″W
- Area: 10 acres (4.0 ha)
- Elevation: 4,500 ft (1,400 m)
- Opened: 1962
- Operator: Utah State Parks
- Visitors: 56,126 (in 2025)
- Website: Official website
- Utah State Parks

Goosenecks State Park is a state park in the U.S. state of Utah, overlooking a deep meander of the San Juan River. The park is located near the southern border of the state a short distance from Mexican Hat, Utah. Millions of years ago, the Monument Upwarp forced the river to carve incised meanders over 1,000 feet (300 m) deep as the surrounding landscape slowly rose in elevation. Eroded by water, wind, frost, and gravity, this is a classic location for observing incised meanders.

Goosenecks State Park is largely undeveloped. Primitive campsites with picnic tables are scattered back from the edge of the cliff, and vault toilets are available. Campers are advised to bring their own water, food, and other necessary gear.

The park received International Dark Sky Park designation by The International Dark-Sky Association in March, 2021. Night photography and stargazing are popular activities because there is little light pollution due to its remoteness.

There are no developed hiking trails in the park, but the Honaker Trail, a few miles to the northwest, provides access to the San Juan River.

Panoramic view from overlook, 2026
