= Cedar Mesa Sandstone =

Geologic member in the United States

- Stratigraphic range: Early Permian, 286–270 Ma
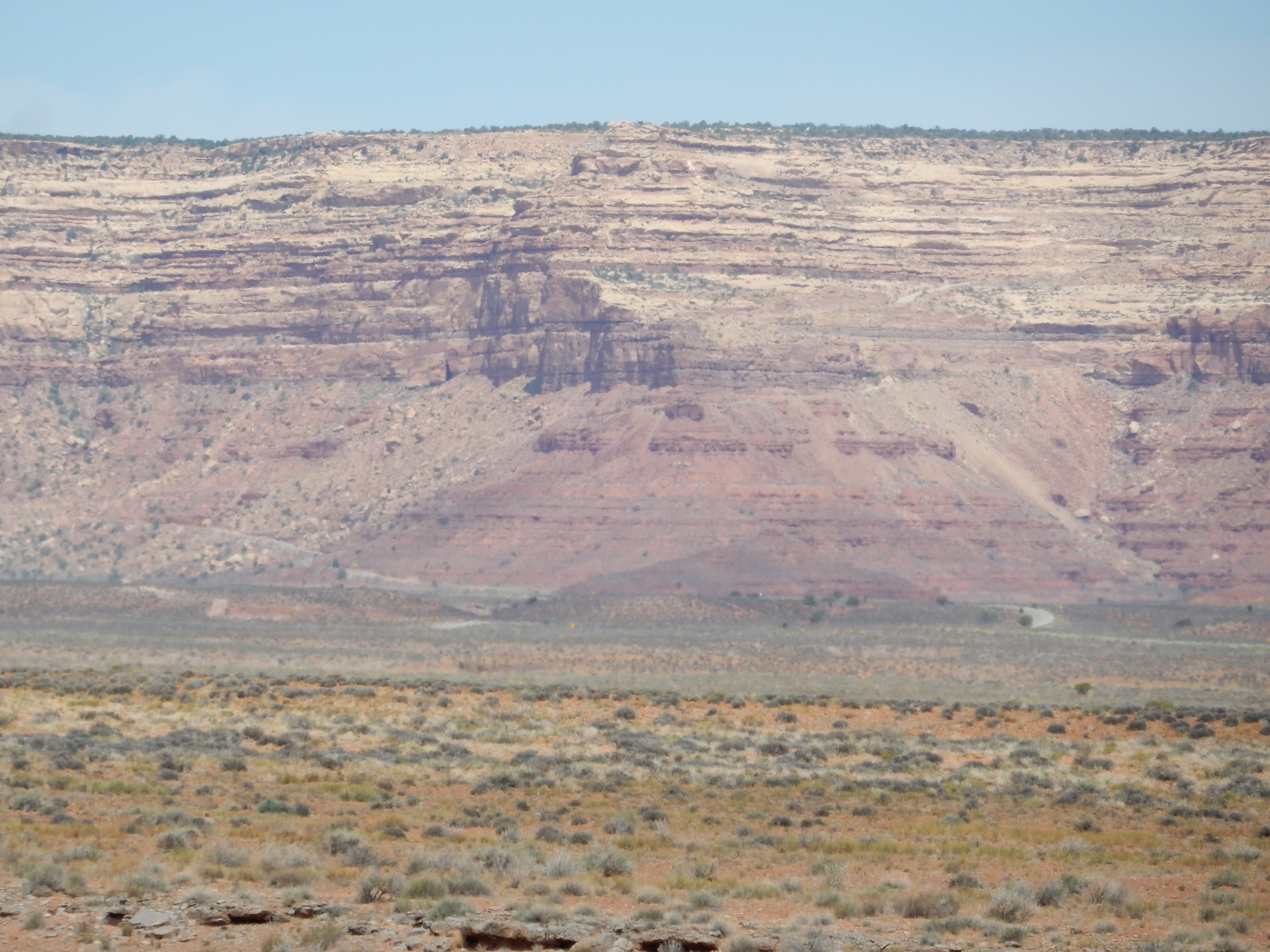
- Cedar Mesa Sandstone at its type location, capping Cedar Mesa, Utah
- Type: Geological member
- Unit of: Cutler Formation
- Underlies: Organ Rock Shale
- Overlies: Elephant Canyon Formation; Halgaito Member
- Thickness: Over 1,000 feet (300 m)

Lithology
- Primary: Sandstone

Location
- Coordinates: 37°23′N 109°55′W
- Region: Colorado Plateau
- Country: United States

Type section
- Named for: Cedar Mesa
- Named by: Arthur A. Baker; John B. Reeside, Jr., 1929
- Cedar Mesa Sandstone (the United States) Cedar Mesa Sandstone (Utah)

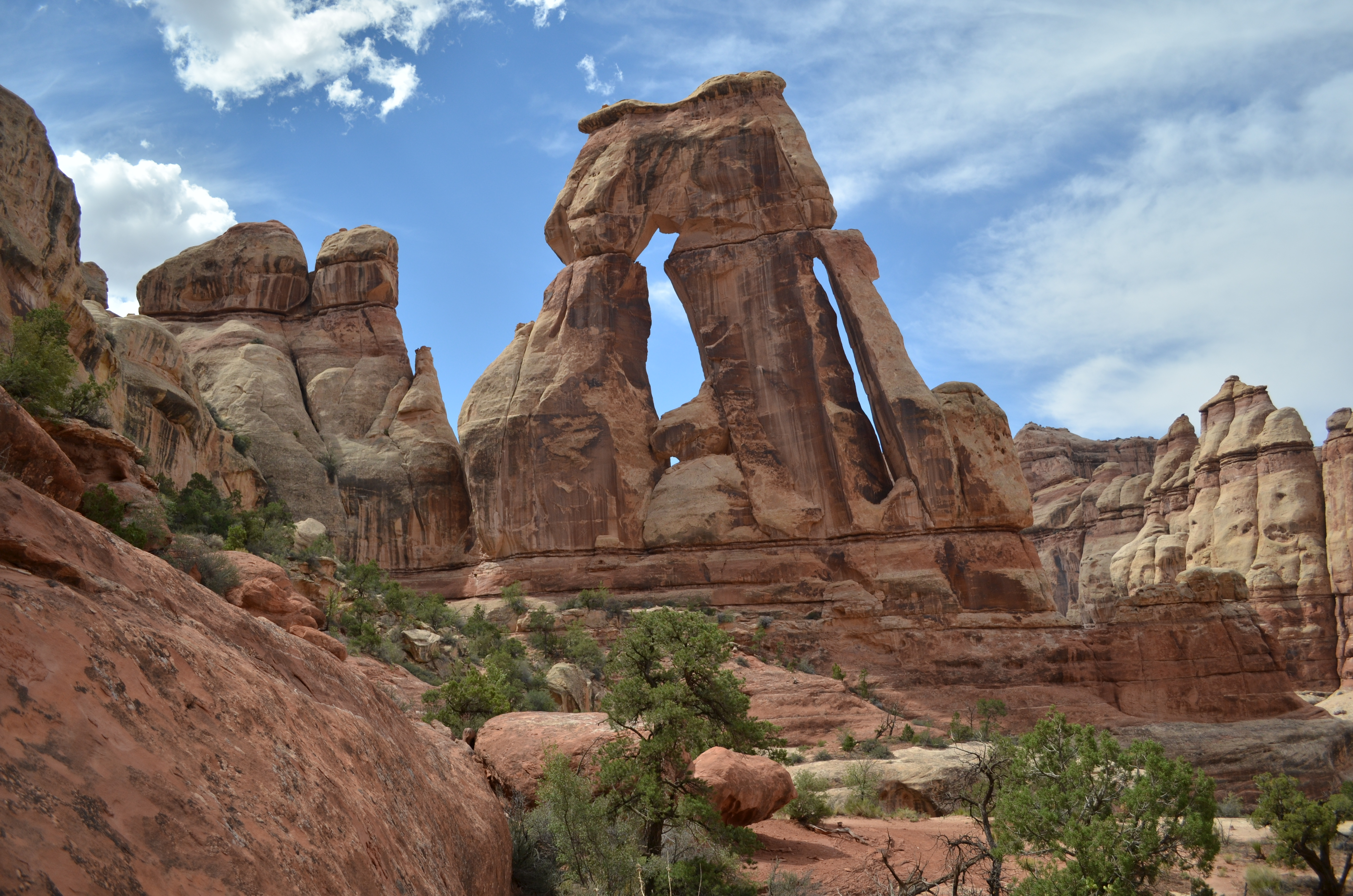
Druid Arch in Canyonlands National Park, an eroded fin of Cedar Mesa Sandstone

Cedar Mesa Sandstone (also known as the Cedar Mesa Formation) is a sandstone member of the Cutler Formation, found in southeast Utah, southwest Colorado, northwest New Mexico, and northeast Arizona.

== Description ==
The Cedar Mesa Sandstone consists mainly of red and white sandstone showing cross-bedding typical of an eolian sandstone. The thick beds of cross-bedded sandstone are separated by thin layers of siltstone or other softer rock that erodes more easily, forming horizontal recesses. These have been traced for over 200 kilometers (120 mi) and contain rhizoliths (fossil roots) and other indications that a thin soil layer developed. At its type location at Cedar Mesa near the San Juan River in Utah, the sandstone is 500 feet (150 m) to over 1,000 feet (300 m) thick. Drill holes near Glen Canyon have penetrated more than 1,200 feet (370 m) of Ceder Mesa beds. To the southeast, at the limits of surface exposure, the sandstone intertongues with beds of gypsum, siltstone, and limestone, which continue into the subsurface for another 125 kilometers (78 mi). The sandstone is assigned to the Cutler Formation, and overlies the Halgaito Member and in turn is overlain by the Organ Rock Member. North and northeast of the confluence of the Colorado and Green Rivers, the sandstone intertongues with undifferentiated Cutler Formation beds.

The Cutler is raised to group rank in some areas of the Colorado Plateau, and its members, including the Cedar Mesa Sandstone, are then raised to formation rank.

In addition to capping Cedar Mesa, the Cedar Mesa Sandstone forms the spires and canyons found in the Needles and Maze districts of Canyonlands National Park, the inner gorge of White Canyon, and the three natural bridges of Natural Bridges National Monument. The sandstone continues in the subsurface into the Four Corners region.

Cedar Mesa Sandstone is the remains of coastal sand dunes deposited about 270 to 300 million years ago, during the Wolfcampian (early Permian). The red and white banded appearance is a result of periodic floods which carried iron-rich sediments down from the Uncompahgre Mountains during its formation. The cross-bedding dips consistently to the southeast, showing that prevailing winds were from the northwest, and the source of the sand making up the sandstone was the shallow sea to the west and north.

The origin of the thin layers of softer rock is not settled, but one possibility is that these layers developed at times when the water table rose. This cut off the supply of sand, and wind erosion then eroded the dune field flat at the level of the water table, where a thin soil developed and became vegetated.

The interbedded gypsum, siltstone, and limestone to the southeast are interpreted as sabkha deposits, deposited in saline coastal flats.

== Fossils ==
Fragmented fossils are found in some of the thin layers of softer rock. These include large (up to 1 by 8 meters (3 ft 3 in by 26 ft 3 in)) petrified conifer logs, small horsetail (Equisetum) stem fragments, and fern leaves resembling Asterotheca. These are thought to have been brought into the dune field by large flood events. Reptile bones and teeth, including a possible jaw fragment of a pelycosaur, have also been found in the formation.

== History of investigation ==
The beds belonging to the unit were originally assigned to the Coconino Sandstone of northern Arizona, but were reassigned to the Cedar Mesa sandstone member of the Cutler Formation by A.A. Baker and John B. Reeside, Jr., in 1929. They named the member for its exposures capping Cedar Mesa. S.A. Wengerd and M.L. Matheny recommended raising the Cedar Mesa Sandstone to formation rank in 1958.

== See also ==
- Geology of the Canyonlands area
