= Honaker Trail Formation =

Geologic formation in Utah, United States

- Stratigraphic range: Carboniferous
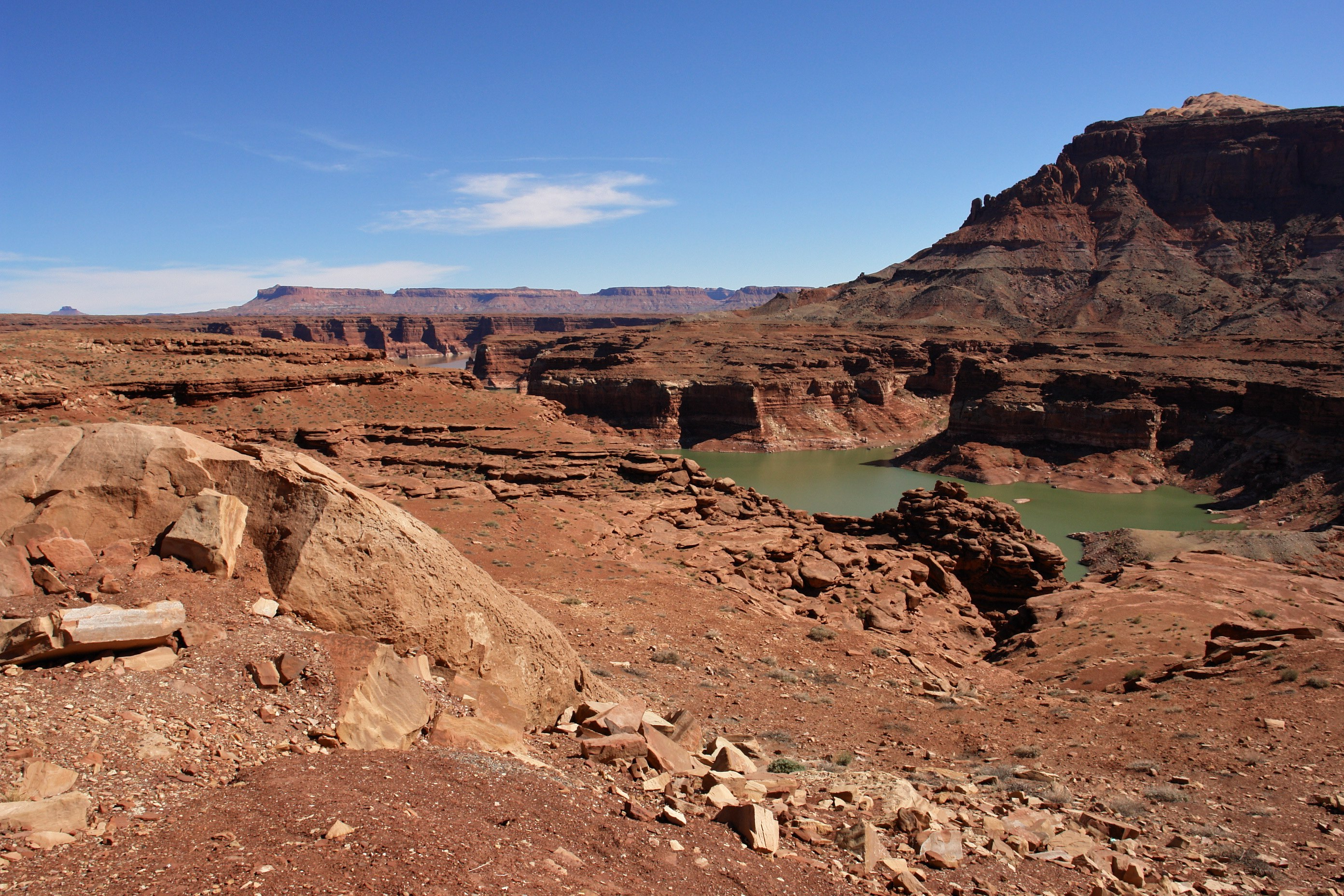
- Twice Expandable photo The gray-layer on right is the Honaker Trail (approximately 100 ft thick?)
- Type: Formation
- Unit of: Hermosa Group
- Underlies: Elephant Canyon Formation & Halgaito Formation
- Overlies: Paradox Formation

Location
- Region: Utah
- Country: United States

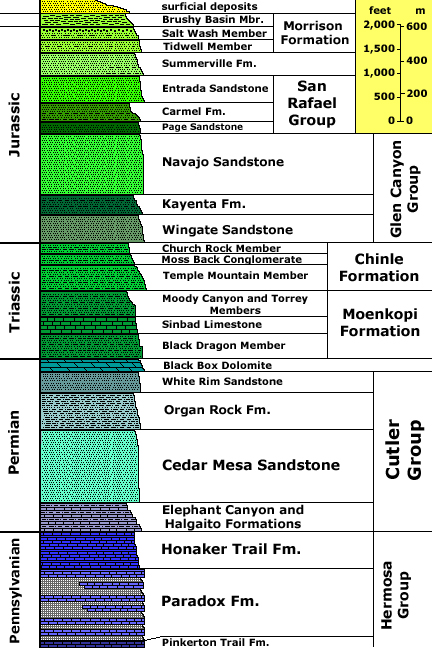

The Honaker Trail Formation is a geologic formation in Utah. It preserves fossils dating back to the Carboniferous period.

It is a member of the 3-member Hermosa Group and is located above the Paradox Formation in the dramatic site of Goosenecks State Park, Utah, notably Cataract Canyon. It is gray-colored above the multi-layered Paradox deep in Cataract Canyon, riverside.

== Goosenecks panorama ==
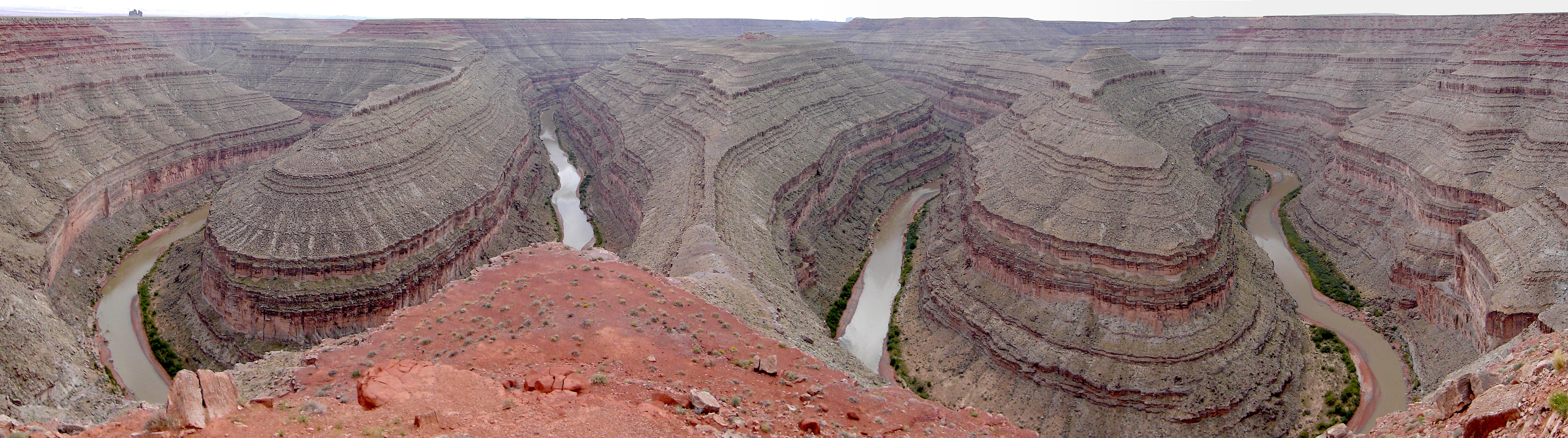

== See also ==
- Honaker Trail
- List of fossiliferous stratigraphic units in Utah
- Paleontology in Utah
