= Halgaito Formation =

- Stratigraphic range: Permian
- Type: Formation
- Unit of: Cutler Group
- Underlies: Elephant Canyon Formation
- Overlies: Honaker Trail Formation of the Hermosa Formation
- Thickness: 350 to 800 feet (110 to 240 m)

Lithology
- Primary: Shale

Location
- Country: United States

Type section
- Named for: Halgaito Spring, southwest of Medicine Hat, Navajo Co., AZ (Baker and Reeside, 1929)
- Named by: Baker and Reeside, 1929

The Halgaito Formation is the basal Permian geologic member of the Cutler Group in southern Utah. The member consists of silty sandstone, siltstone and limestone. The Elephant Canyon may grade into the Halgaito and grades northward into the Cedar Mesa Formation.

== Extent ==
There is no designated type locality for the Halgaito. The shale can be seen at the confluence of the Green River and Colorado Rivers and in Cataract Canyon.
