= Elephant Canyon Formation =

Geologic formation

- Stratigraphic range: Permian
- Type: Formation
- Unit of: Cutler Group
- Underlies: Cedar Mesa Sandstone
- Overlies: Unconformity on the Pennsylvanian Honaker Trail Formation

Lithology
- Primary: Sandstone
- Other: Limestone, siltstone, shale

Location
- Region: Utah: Paradox basin
- Country: United States

Type section
- Named for: Type section: Elephant Canyon, secs. 4 and 9, T. 30 S., R. 19 E., San Juan County, Utah
- Named by: Baars, D. L., 1962

The Elephant Canyon Formation is the basal Permian geologic formation of the Cutler Group overlying an unconformity on the Pennsylvanian Honaker Trail Formation in the Paradox Basin of southern Utah.

Description

It consists of pink dolomite, light-gray dolomitic sandstone, light-brown and moderate-red, fine-grained sandstone, a basal conglomerate and conglomeratic sandstone, and limestone. The basal conglomerate is composed of moderately sorted cherts up to 3 cm in diameter. It weathers to a medium brown and forms hackly, blocky ledges and intervening slopes.

== See also ==
- List of fossiliferous stratigraphic units in Utah
- Paleontology in Utah
