= List of Greek and Latin roots in English/S =

Lists of Greek and Latin roots in English beginning with other letters:
- A
- B
- C
- D
- E
- F
- G
- H
- I
- J
- K
- L
- M
- N
- O
- P
- Q
- R
- S
- T
- U
- V
- X
- Z

== S ==
Root	Meaning in English	Origin language	Etymology (root origin)	English examples
sacc-	bag	Greek	σάκκος (sákkos)	sack
sacchar-	sugar	Greek	σάκχαρ, σάκχαρον (sákkharon)	disaccharide, heteropolysaccharide, homopolysaccharide, lipooligosaccharide, lipopolysaccharide, monosaccharide, oligosaccharide, pentasaccharide, polysaccharide, saccharin, trisaccharide
sacr-, -secr-	sacred	Latin	sacrare, from sacer (genitive sacri)	consecrate, desecrate, sacrament, sacred, sacrosanct
sagac-	wise	Latin	sagax, sagacis	sagacious, sagacity
sagitt-	arrow	Latin	sagitta	sagittal plane, Sagittaria
sal-	salt	Latin	sal, salis, salere, salarium	salary, salinity
sali-, -sili-, salt-	jump	Latin	salire, saltus	assail, assailable, assailant, assailment, assault, assaultive, consilience, desultory, dissilience, dissilient, exult, exultant, exultation, insult, insultation, irresilient, resile, resilement, resilience, resiliency, resilient, result, resultant, salacious, salacity, salience, salient, sally, saltando, saltant, saltation, saltatorial, saltatory, saltigrade, saltire, salto, saltus, sault, sauté, sauteuse, sautille, sautoir, somersault, soubresaut, subsultory, transilience, transilient
salic-	willow	Latin	salix, salicis	salicin
salping-	trumpet	Greek	σάλπιγξ, σάλπιγγος (sálpinx, sálpingos)	endosalpingiosis, hysterosalpingography, salpiglossis, salpinx
salu-	health, welfare	Latin	salus	salubrious, salubrity, salutary, salute
salv-	save	Latin	salvus, salvare	salvage, salvation, salve
san-	healthy	Latin	sanus	insane, insanity, sanatorium, sane, sanitarian, sanitarium, sanitary, sanitation, sanity
sanc-	holy	Latin	sancire (past participle sanctus)	sacrosanct, saint, sanctify, sanction, sanctuary
sanguin-	blood	Latin	sanguis, sanguinis	consanguinity, sanguinary, sanguine
sapi-, -sipi-	taste, wise	Latin	sapere "to have a taste, be wise", related to sapor "taste, flavor"	insipid, insipience, sapient
sapon-	soap	Latin from Frankish	sapo, saponis	saponification
sapphir-	a precious stone	Greek from Hebrew	σάπφειρος (sáppheiros)	sapphire, sapphirine
sapr-	rotten	Greek	σήπειν, σαπρός (saprós), σαπρότης	sapraemia, saprogenic, saprophagous, saprophyte, saprotrophic
sarc-	flesh	Greek	σάρξ, σαρκός (sárx, sarkós)	perisarc, sarcasm, sarcastic, sarcocele, sarcoid, sarcoidosis, sarcoma, sarcophagus, Sarcopterygii, sarcosine, sarcosinemia, sarcosome
sarc-	tailor	Latin	sartor "tailor", from sarcire "to mend"	consarcination, sartor, sartorial, sartorius
sati-	enough	Latin	satis	asset, sate, satiate, satiety, satisfy, saturate
saur-	lizard, reptile	Greek	σαύρα (saúra), σαῦρος (saûros)	dinosaur, Saurischia, sauropod
sax-	rock	Latin	saxum	saxatile, saxicavous, saxicoline, saxifrage, saxifragous
scab-	scratch	Latin	scabere	scabies
scal-	ladder, stairs	Latin	scala	scalar, scale
scalen-	uneven	Greek	σκαληνός (skalēnós)	scalene, scalene muscles, scalene triangle, scalenohedron
scand-, -scend-, scans-, -scens-	climb	Latin	scandere	ascend, ascendency, ascendent, ascension, ascent, condescend, condescendence, condescension, descend, descendent, descension, descent, scansion, transcend, transcendence, transcendent, transcendental
scandal-	snare	Greek	σκάνδαλον (skándalon), σκανδαλίζω (skandalízō)	scandal, scandalize
scap-	shaft	Greek	σκᾶπος (skâpos)	scape, scapus
scaph-	anything hollow, bowl, ship	Greek	σκάφη, σκάφος	Scaphirhynchus, scaphoid bone, scaphopod
scat-	dung	Greek	σκῶρ, σκατός (skôr, skatós)	scatemia, scatology, scatoma, scatomancy, scatophagy, scatoscopy
sced-	scatter	Greek	σκεδαννύναι (skedannúnai), σκέδασις (skédasis), (skedastós), (skedastikós)	heteroscedastic, homoscedastic
scel-	leg, thigh	Greek	σκέλος, σκέλεος (skéleos)	isosceles, triskele, triskelion
scen-	booth, tent	Greek	σκηνή (skēnḗ)	parascenium, proscenium, scene, scenic, scenography
scept-, scop-	look at, examine, view, observe	Greek	σκέπτεσθαι (sképtesthai), σκέψις (sképsis), σκέμμα, σκεπτικός (skeptikós), σκοπεῖν (skopeîn), σκοπός, σκοποῦ (skopós)	Abroscopus, diascopic, diascopy, endoscope, endoscopic, endoscopy, epidiascope, episcope, episcopic, gastroscopy, kaleidoscope, macroscopic, microscope, microscopic, panendoscopy, periscope, periscopic, scope, scopophobia, skeptic, stereoscopic, stereoscopy, stethoscope, telescope, telescopic, Telescopium
schem-	plan	Greek	σχῆμα (skhêma)	schema, schematic, schematism, schematize, scheme
schid- (ΣΧΙΔ)	split	Greek	σχίζειν (skhízein), σχιστός (skhistós), σχίσις (skhísis), σχίσμα (skhísma), σχίζα	diaschisis, diaschisma, schisis, schism, schisma, schismatic, schizocarp, schizogamy, schizogony, schizoid, schizophrenia, schizotrichia
sci-	shade, shadow	Greek	σκιά (skiá), σκιάς	sciamachy, sciaphobia
sci-	know	Latin	scire	conscience, conscious, conscientious, omniscious, omniscient, prescient, science, scienter
scind-, sciss-	split	Latin	scindere	rescind, scissors
scler-	hard	Greek	σκέλλειν (skéllein), σκληρός (sklērós), σκληρότης (sklērótēs)	sclera, sclerectomy, scleredema, sclereid, sclerema, sclerenchyma, sclerite, scleritis, scleroderma, sclerophyll, sclerophyllous, sclerosis, sclerotic, sclerotium, sclerotize
scolec-	worm	Greek	σκώληξ, σκώληκος (skṓlēx, skṓlēkos)	scolex
scoli-	crooked	Greek	σκολιός (skoliós), σκολιότης	scoliokyphosis, scoliosis
scombr-	mackerel	Greek	σκόμβρος (skómbros)	scombrid, scombroid
scop-		Greek		
scot-	darkness	Greek	σκότος, σκότου, σκοταῖος	scotobiology, scotochromogen, scotogenic, scotograph, scotoma, scotoperiod, scotophase, scotophilia, scotophilic, scotophobe, scotophobia, scotophobic, scotophobotaxis, scotopic, scotoscope, scotosis, scototactic, scototaxis, scototherapy
scrib-, script-	write	Latin	scribere, scriptus	describe, inscribe, manuscript, prescribe, scribble, scribe, script, scripture, subscribe
scrupl-	uneasiness	Latin	scrupus "sharp stone"	scruple, scrupulous, unscrupulous
sculp-	carve	Latin	sculpere, sculptus	insculp, resculpt, sculp, sculpsit, sculpt, sculptile, sculptor, sculptress, sculptural, sculpture
scut-	shield	Latin	scutum	scute
scyph-	cup	Greek	σκύφος (skúphos)	scyphoid, Scyphozoa, scyphus
se-, sed-	away, apart	Latin	se	secede, sedition, seditious, seduce
seb-	tallow	Latin	sebum	sebaceous, sebum
sec-, sect-, seg-	cut	Latin	secare	secant, section, segment
sed-	settle, calm	Latin	sedare, sedatus	sedative
sed-, -sid-, sess-	sit	Latin	sedere, sessus	assiduous, insidious, obsession, possess, preside, president, reside, resident, sedentary, sediment, sedimentary, sedulity, sedulous, session, subside, supersede
sedec-	sixteen	Latin	sedecim	sedecimal
seget-	in cornfields	Latin	segetum	
sei-	shake	Greek	σείειν (seíein), σεισμός (seismós), σεῖστρον (seîstron)	aseismic, microseism, microseismic, paleoseismology, seism, seismic, seismogram, seismograph, seismology, seismometer, seismonasty, sistrum, teleseism, teleseismic
selen-	moon	Greek	σελήνη (selḗnē)	paraselene, selaphobia, Selene, selenium, selenocentric, selenography, selenology
sell-	saddle, seat	Latin	sella	sella turcica
sema-	sign	Greek	σῆμα (sêma)	aposematic, asemasia, asemia, asemic, pentaseme, polyseme, polysemic, polysemous, polysemy, semantics, semaphore, semasiology, sematic, seme, sememe, semiotic, tetraseme, triseme
semi-	half	Latin	semis	semiannual, semicolon, semiconductor, semiconscious, semifinal, seminatural
semin-	seed	Latin	semen, seminis	insemination
sen-	old man	Latin	senex, senis	senator, senescent, senile, senility, senior
sen-	six each	Latin	seni	senary
sent-, sens-	feel	Latin	sentire, sensus	assent, consensus, consent, dissent, resent, scent, sensation, sense, sensible, sensitive, sensory, sentence, sentient, sentience, sentiment
sep-	rot	Greek	σήψ (sḗps), σήπειν (sḗpein), σηπτός (sēptós), σηπτικός (sēptikós), σῆψις (sêpsis), σηπία (sēpía)	antisepsis, antiseptic, asepsis, aseptic, sepia, sepsis, septic
sept-	fence, partition, enclosure	Latin	saeptum	transept
sept-	seven	Latin	septem	septennial
septen-	seven each	Latin	septeni	septenary
septim-	seventh	Latin	septimus	septimal, septime
septuagen-	seventy each	Latin	septuageni	septuagenary
septuagesim-	seventieth	Latin	septuagesimus	septuagesima, septuagesimal
septuagint-	seventy	Latin	septuaginta	Septuagint
sequ-, secut-	follow	Latin	sequere, from sequi, see also secutus	consecutive, consequence, ensue, non sequitur, obsequious, prosecute, pursue, second, sequel, sequence, subsequent
ser-	silk	Greek	σήρ (sḗr), σηρικός	sericin, serigraph
ser-	sow	Latin	serere, satus	disseminate, dissemination, insemination, postseason, preseason, sation, sative, season, seasonable, seasonal, semen, semenuria, seminal, seminar, seminarian, seminary, semination, seminiferous
ser-	attach, join	Latin	serere, sertus	assert, assertion, assertive, curviserial, desert, desertion, desertrix, dissert, dissertation, dissertator, exert, exertion, insert, insertion, multiseriate, reassert, reassertion, rectiserial, semidesert, serial, seriate, seriatim, series, sermon, uniseriate
ser-	whey	Latin	serum	serac, serosa, serous, subserous
ser-	late	Latin	sērus	serein, serotine, serotinous, serotiny, soiree
serp-	crawl, creep	Latin	serpere, serptus	serpent
serr-	saw, saw-toothed	Latin	serra, serrare	biserrate, serrate, serration, serrature, serriform, serrulate, sierra, sierran
serv-	save, protect, serve	Latin	servare	conserve, deserve, observe, preserve, reserve, servant, service, servile, servitude, subservient
sesqui-	one and a half	Latin	sesqui	sesquialteral, sesquicentennial, sesquipedal, sesquiplicate, sesquitertian
set-	bristle, hair	Latin	saeta	seta, setose
sever-	stern, strict, serious	Latin	severus	asseverate, asseveration, perseverance, perseverant, perseverate, perseveration, perseverative, persevere, severe, severity
sex-	sexual	Latin	sexus	sexual, sexuality, sex, Sexual Intercourse (abbr. "sex)
sex-, se-	six	Latin	sex	semester, sexangle, sexangular, sexavalent, sexennial, sexennium, sexireme, sexivalent, sexpartite, sexradiate, sextain
sexagen-	sixty each	Latin	sexageni	sexagenarian, sexagenary
sexagesim-	sixtieth	Latin	sexagesimus	Sexagesima, sexagesimal
sext-	sixth	Latin	sextus	bissextile, bissextus, semisextile, sestet, sestina, Sext, sextain, sextan, sextans, sextant, sextary, sextic, sextile, sextillion, siesta, sixte
sibil-	hiss	Latin	sibilus, sibilare	sibilance
sicc-	dry	Latin	siccare "to dry", from siccus "dry, thirsty"	desiccate, desiccation, sec, siccative
sicy-	cucumber	Greek	σίκυος (síkuos)	Sicyos
sider-	iron	Greek	σίδηρος (sídēros), σιδήρεος	siderodromophobia, siderophile
sider-	star	Latin	sidus, sideris	sidereal
sigm-	S, s	Greek	σίγμα, σῖγμα (sîgma)	sigma, sigmatism, sigmatropic, sigmoid, sigmoidoscopy
sign-	sign	Latin	signum	design, designate, insignia, signal, signature, significant
sil-	quiet or still	Latin	silere	silence
silv-, sylv-	forest	Latin	silva, sylva	silviculture, sylvan, sylvatic
simi-	ape, monkey	Latin	simia	simian
simil-, simul-	likeness, imitating	Latin	simulare "to emulate", from similis "alike"	assimilate, dissimilate, dissemble, ensemble, resemble, semblance, similar, similarity, simile, similitude, simulacrum, simular, simulate, simulation, simulator, simultaneous, verisimilar, verisimilitude
sinap-	mustard	Greek	σίναπι (sínapi), (sināpízein), (sināpismós)	sinapine, sinapism
singul-	one each	Latin	singulus	singular
sinistr-	left	Latin	sinister, sinistri	sinistral
sin-	China, Chinese	Latin	Sina	sinology, Sinanthropus
sinu-	(to draw) a line	Latin	sinuare	insinuate
sinus-	hollow, bay	Latin	sinus	sinusoidal
siop-	silence	Greek	σιωπή (siōpḗ), σιωπᾶν (siōpân), σιωπητέος (siōpētéos), σιώπησις (siṓpēsis)	aposiopesis, aposiopetic
siph-	tube	Greek	σίφων (síphōn)	siphon, siphonoglyph
sist-	cause to stand	Latin	sistere	assist, consist, desist, exist, insist, persist, resist, solstice, subsist
sit-	food, grain, wheat	Greek	σῖτος, σίτου (sîtos, sítou)	ectoparasite, endoparasite, endoparasitoid, epiparasite, hyperparasitism, kleptoparasitism, mesoparasite, parasite, parasitic, parasitism, parasitoid, sitology, syssitia
siz-	hiss	Greek	σίζω, σίξις (síxis)	
smaragd-	emerald	Greek	σμάραγδος (smáragdos), σμαράγδινος (smarágdinos)	smaragdine
smil-	carving knife	Greek	σμίλη (smílē), σμιλεύω, σμιλευτός, σμίλευμα	smilodon
soci-	group	Latin	socius, sociare	associate, association, associative, consociate, consociation, consociational, disassociate, disassociation, dissociable, dissocial, dissociate, dissociation, dissociative, interassociation, nonassociative, sociability, sociable, social, sociality, societal, society
sol-	sun	Latin	sol, solis	circumsolar, extrasolar, insolate, insolation, solar, solarium, soliform, soliscence, solstice, subsolar
sol-	comfort, soothe	Latin	solari	consolation, console, solace
sol-	alone, only	Latin	solus	desolate, desolation, desolatory, saudade, sole, soliloquy, solitaire, solitary, solitude, solitudinarian, solitudinous, solivagous, solo, sullen
sole-	accustomed	Latin	solere "be accustomed"	insolence, insolent, obsolescence, obsolescent, obsolete
solen-	channel, pipe	Greek	σωλήν (sōlḗn)	solenocyte, solenodon, solenogaster, solenoid, Solenopsis
solv-, solut-	loosen, set free	Latin	solvere, solutus	absolute, absolve, dissolute, dissolve, resolute, resolve, soluble, solute, solution, solve, solvent
soma-	body	Greek	σῶμα, σώματος (sôma, sṓmatos)	allosome, asomatous, autosome, centrosome, chromosome, decasomy, disomic, disomy, episome, gonosome, heptasomy, heterochromosome, heterodisomic, heterodisomy, hexasomy, isodisomic, isodisomy, macrosomia, metasomatic, metasomatism, microsome, microsomia, monosome, monosomic, monosomy, pentasomic, pentasomy, plasmosome, polysomic, polysomy, pyrosome, somatic, somatomancy, somatoparaphrenia, somatopleure, somatotype, somite, tetrasomic, tetrasomy, trisomic, trisomy
somn-	sleep	Latin	somnus	insomnia, somnambulist, somnifacient, somniferous, somnific, somniloquy, somnolent
somni-	dream	Latin	somnium	somnial
son-	sound	Latin	sonus	absonant, ambisonic, assonance, assonant, assonate, consonance, consonant, consonous, dissonance, dissonant, inconsonance, inconsonant, infrasonic, infrasound, magnisonant, resonance, resonant, resonate, resound, sonance, sonant, sonata, sondage, sonnet, sonorant, sonority, sound, subsonic, supersonic, triconsonantal, ultrasonic, ultrasound
soph-	wise	Greek	σοφός (sophós), σοφία (sophía), σόφισμα (sóphisma), σοφισμός (sophismós)	antisophism, pansophism, pansophist, pansophy, philosophize, philosophy, sophism, sophist, sophistry, sophisticate, Sophocles, sophomania, sophomaniac, sophomore, sophomoric
sopor-	deep sleep	Latin	sopor	sopor, soporific
sorb-, sorpt-	suck	Latin	sorbere	absorb, absorbency, absorbent, absorption, absorptive, absorptivity, adsorb, adsorbent, adsorption, exsorption, insorption, malabsorption, resorb, resorption, resorptive, sorbent, sorbile, sorbition, sorption
sord-	dirt	Latin	sordere, sordes	sordes, sordid
soror-	sister	Latin	soror	cousin, sororal, sororate, sororicide, sorority
spa-	draw, pull	Greek	σπᾶν (spân), σπάσις (spásis), σπασμός (spasmós), σπάσμα (spásma), σπαστικός (spastikós), σπώμενον (spṓmenon), σπάδιξ (spádix), σπαδίζω	antispasmodic, palinspastic, perispomenon, properispomenon, spadix, spasm, spasmatic, spasmodic, spasmogenic, spasmolytic, spastic, spasticity
spad-	eunuch	Greek	σπάδος (spádos), σπάδων (spádōn), σπαδοειδής	epispadias, hypospadias
sparg-, -sperg-, spars-, -spers-	scatter, sprinkle	Latin	spargere	asperse, aspersion, aspersive, dispersal, disperse, dispersion, dispersive, insperse, inspersion, interspersal, intersperse, interspersion, nonaspersion, nondispersive, nonsparse, sparge, spargefaction, sparse, sparsity
spath-	blade	Greek	σπάθη (spáthē)	spade, spatha, spathe, spay
spati-	space	Latin	spatium	interspace, interspatial, space, spatial, spatiate, subspace
spec-, -spic-, spect-	look	Latin	perspicuus, specere, spectare, speculari	aspect, aspectual, auspicate, auspice, auspicious, biaspectual, bispecific, bispecificity, circumspect, circumspection, circumspective, conspecific, conspecificity, conspectus, conspicuous, despection, despicable, despiciency, despise, despite, disrespect, disrespectable, especial, expect, expectancy, expectant, expectation, inauspicious, incircumspect, inconspicuous, infraspecific, inspect, inspection, inspector, inspeximus, interspecies, interspecific, intraspecies, intraspecific, introspection, introspective, irrespective, multispecific, multispecificity, multispectral, nonspecific, perspective, perspicacious, perspicuity, perspicuous, prospect, prospective, prospector, prospectus, prospicience, prospicient, reinspect, respect, respectability, respectable, respectant, respective, respite, retrospection, retrospective, special, speciality, speciation, specie, species, specific, specification, specificity, specimen, speciosity, specious, spectacle, spectacular, spectacularity, spectant, spectation, spectator, spectatorial, spectral, spectre, spectrum, specular, speculate, speculation, speculative, speculator, speculatory, speculum, spice, spite, subspeciality, subspecies, suspect, suspicion, suspicious, transpicuous, trispecific, unispecific
speir-, spor-	sow	Greek	σπείρω (speírō), σπαρτός, σπορά, σποράς, σποράδος (sporás, sporádos), σποραδικός (sporadikós), σπόρος (spóros)	aplanospore, archesporium, carpospore, chlamydospore, diaspora, diaspore, endospore, esparto, eusporangium, exospore, heterosporous, heterospory, homosporous, isosporous, leptosporangium, megasporangium, megaspore, microsporangium, microspore, mitospore, sporadic, sporangiospore, sporangium, spore, sporocarp, sporophyte, teliospore, tetraspore, tetrasporophytic, zygospore
spele-	cavern	Greek	σπέος (spéos), σπήλαιον (spḗlaion)	speleogen, speleogenesis, speleology, Speleomantes, speleomorphology, speleoseismite, speleothem, speleotherapy
spelyng-	cave	Greek	σπῆλυγξ, (spêlynx, spēlyng-)	spelunk
spend-, spond-	pledge, promise	Greek	σπένδειν (spéndein), σπονδή, σπονδάς (spondḗ, spondás), σπονδεῖος, σπονδικός	spondaic, Sponde, spondee
sper-	hope	Latin	spes, sperare	despair, desperado, desperate, desperation, esperance, prosper, prosperity, prosperous
sperm-	seed	Greek	σπέρμα, σπέρματος (spérma, spérmatos)	angiosperm, endosperm, gymnosperm, perisperm, sperm, spermatid, spermatocyte, spermatogenesis, spermatogonium, spermatozoon, stenospermocarpy
sphal- (ΣΦΑΛ)	cause to fall	Greek	σφάλλειν (sphállein), σφαλερός (sphalerós), σφαλλόμενον	sphalerite, sphaleron
sphen-	wedge	Greek	σφήν, σφηνός (sphḗn, sphēnós)	sphenic, Sphenodon, sphenoid
spher-	ball	Greek	σφαῖρα (sphaîra)	aspheric, hemisphere, hypersphere, mesosphere, pseudosphere, sphere, spherics, spheroid, spherometer, spherulite, stratosphere, trimetasphere, troposphere
sphing-, sphinct-	strangle	Greek	σφίγγειν (sphíngein), Σφίγξ sphings, σφιγκτήρ	sphincter
sphondyl-	vertebra	Greek	σφόνδυλος, σφονδύλου (sphóndulos, sphondúlou)	spondylitis, spondylolisthesis, spondylolysis, spondylosis, Temnospondyli
sphrag-	seal	Greek	σφραγίς (sphragís), (sphragistikós), σφραγίζω	sphragistic
sphyg-	pulse	Greek	σφύζειν (sphúzein), σφυγμός (sphugmós), (sphugmikós), (sphúxis)	asphyxia, sphygmic, sphygmochronograph, sphygmograph, sphygmomanometer, sphygmus
spic-	spike	Latin	spica	spica, spicate, spicose, spicosity, spicular, spiculate, spicule, spiculiform
spin-	thorn	Latin	spina	infraspinate, infraspinatus, interspinal, spinal, spine, spinel, spinescent, spiniferous, spiniform, spinose, spinous
spir-	breathe	Latin	spirare	aspire, conspire, expire, inspire, perspire, respiration, spirit
splen-	spleen	Greek	σπλήν (splḗn), splēnikós	asplenia, hypersplenism, hyposplenia, polysplenia, splenectomy, splenic, splenitis, splenoid, splenomegaly
spond-, spons-	a surety, guarantee; give assurance, promise solemnly	Latin	spondere, sponsus	correspond, correspondence, correspondent, corresponsive, cosponsor, despond, despondency, despondent, desponsage, desponsate, desponsation, disespouse, espousage, espousal, espouse, interspousal, irresponsibility, irresponsible, irresponsive, nonresponsive, respond, respondee, respondence, respondent, response, responsibility, responsible, responsion, responsive, responsivity, riposte, sponsal, sponsion, sponsional, sponsor, spousal, spouse
spondyl-	vertebra	Greek	σπόνδυλος (spóndulos)	platyspondyly, spondylid, spondylolisthesis, spondylolysis, spondylopyosis, spondyloschisis, spondylosis, spondylosyndesis, Spondylus
spu-, sput-	spew, spit	Latin	spuere	exspuition, sputum
squal-	scaly, dirty, filthy	Latin	squalere	squalid, squalidity, squalor
squam-	scale	Latin	squama	squamous
squarros-	spreading at tips	Latin	squarrosus	squarrose
st- (ΣΤΑ)	cause to stand	Greek	ἵστημι histēmi, histánai, στατικός, στάσις, στατήρ, στήλη	acrostatic, actinostele, anastasis, antistatic, apostasy, apostate, astasia, astasis, astatic, astatine, catastasis, chronostasis, diastase, diastasis, diastatic, diasystem, ecstasy, ecstatic, epistasis, episteme, epistemic, epistemology, eustasis, eustatic, eustele, haplostele, homeostasis, homeostatic, hydrostatic, hypostasis, hypostasize, hypostatic, hypostatize, mesostatic, metastasis, metastasize, metastatic, metasystem, orthostates, orthostatic, protostele, stasimon, stasis, stater, static, statoblast, statocyst, statolith, stela, stele, systasis, system, systematic, systematize, systematology, systemic, teleutostatic
st-	stand	Latin	stare "to stand", also causative form statuere "to enact, set", from status "condition, position"	antestature, arrest, arrestant, arrestee, bistability, bistable, bistate, circumstance, circumstantial, consist, constable, constabulary, constancy, constant, constitute, consubstantiation, contrast, distance, distant, equidistance, equidistant, establish, estate, extant, inconstancy, inconstant, instability, instance, instant, obstacle, presto, stable, stamen, stamina, stance, stanchion, stanza, state, station, stationary, statistic, statue, status, staunch, stay, substance, substantial, substantiality, substantiate, substantiation, substantive, substate, substation, substitute, superstation, superstition, superstitious, transubstantiate, transubstantiation, tristate
stagn-	pool of standing water	Latin	stagnare	stagnant
stala-	dripping, trickling	Greek	σταλακτός (stalaktós) and σταλαγμός (stalagmós), both from σταλάζειν (stalázein) "to drip"	stalactite, stalagmite
stann-	tin	Latin	stannum	stannous
staphyl-	bunch of grapes	Greek	σταφυλή (staphulḗ)	staphyledema, staphylion, staphylococcus, staphyloderma, staphyloplasty
statu-, -stitu-	stand	Latin	statuere	institution, statute
steat-	fat, tallow	Greek	στέαρ, στέατος (stéar, stéatos)	stearic acid, steatolysis, steatolytic, steatosis
steg-	cover	Greek	στέγειν, στέγη (stégē), στεγανός (steganós)	steganography, steganopod, Stegosaurus
stell-, stol-	send	Greek	στέλλω (stéllō), στάλσις (stálsis), στολή (stolḗ)	apostle, centrostaltic, diastole, epistle, epistolic, epistolize, epistolography, eusystole, hypodiastole, peristalsis, peristaltic, peristole, stole, systaltic, systole
stell-	star	Latin	stella	constellate, constellation, stellar
sten-	stand	Greek	στεναί (stenaí)	apostasy, apostate
sten-	narrow	Greek	στενός (stenós)	stenography, stenosis
stere-	solid	Greek	στερεός (stereós)	allosteric, stereochemistry, stereochromy, stereographic, stereography, stereoisomer, stereometry, stereophonic, stereopsis, stereoscope, stereoscopy, stereotaxis, stereotomy, stereotype, stereotypic, steric
stern-	breastbone	Greek	στέρνον (stérnon)	metasternum, prosternum, sternum
stern-, strat-	spread, strew	Latin	sternere, stratus	consternation, prostrate, stratify, stratum, stratus, street
steth-	chest	Greek	στῆθος (stêthos)	stethoscope
sthen-	strength	Greek	σθένος (sthénos)	asthenia, asthenosphere, callisthenics, hyposthenia, sthène, sthenia
stich-	line, row	Greek	στείχειν (steíkhein), στίχος (stíkhos)	acrostic, cadastre, distich, distichous, haplostichous, hemistich, heptastich, monostich, monostichous, orthostichy, pentastich, polystichia, polystichous, stich, stichic, stichomancy, stichometry, stichomythia, telestich
stich-	tunic	Greek	στίχη (stíkhē), στιχάριον (stikhárion)	sticharion
stig-	mark, puncture	Greek	στίζειν (stízein), στίξις (stíxis), στίγμα, στίγματος (stígma, stígmatos)	anastigmat, anastigmatic, astigmatic, astigmatism, stigma, stigmata, stigmatic
still-	drip	Latin	stilla, stillare	distillation, instill
stimul-	goad, rouse, excite	Latin	stimulus	stimulate
stin-	stand	Latin	stinare	destination, obstinate
stingu-, stinct-	apart	Latin	stinguere	distinction, distinguish
stoch-	aim	Greek	στόχος (stókhos), στοχαστικός (stokhastikós), στόχασμα	stochastic
stom-	mouth	Greek	στόμα, στόματος (stóma, stómatos)	anastomosis, anastomotic, deuterostome, monostomous, ozostomia, pentastomid, protostome, stoma, stomach, stomatalgia, stomatic, stomatoplasty, -stome
stor- (ΣΤΟΡ)	spread, strew	Greek	στορέννυμι (storénnumi), στόρνυμι, στρῶμα (strôma)	biostrome, stroma
strat-	army	Greek	στρατός (stratós), στρατηγία (stratēgía)	stratagem, strategic, strategist, strategus, strategy, stratocracy, stratography, stratonic
streper-	noise	Latin	strepere	obstreperous
streph-, stroph-, strob-, stromb-	turn	Greek	στρέφειν (stréphein), στρεπτός (streptós), στροφή (strophḗ)	anastrophe, antistrophe, apostrophe, boustrophedon, catastrophe, catastrophic, catastrophism, epistrophe, monostrophe, monostrophic, strophe, strophic
strept-	twisted	Greek	στρέφειν, στρεπτός (streptós), στρεψίς (strepsís)	Strepsiptera, strepsirrhine, streptococcus
strig-	compress	Latin	strix, strigis	strigogyps
strigos-	having stiff bristles	Latin	strigosus from striga	strigose
string-, strict-	tight, upright, stiff	Latin	stringere, strictus	astringent, constrain, constrict, constringe, restrict, strain, strict, stringent
stroph-	turn	Greek		
stru-, struct-	to make up, build	Latin	struere, structus	construct, construction, construe, destroy, destruct, instruct, obstruct, structure
stud-	dedication	Latin	studere	étude, student
stup-	wonder	Latin	stupere	stupid, stupor
styg-	Styx	Greek	Στύξ, Στυγός (Stúx, Stugós), Στύγιος	Stygian, stygiophobia
styl-	column, pillar	Greek	στῦλος (stûlos), στυλόω (stulóō)	amphiprostyle, amphistyly, anastylosis, araeostyle, araeosystyle, blastostyle, diastyle, epistyle, eustyle, hexastyle, hyostyly, hypostyle, monostylous, octastyle, orthostyle, peristyle, prostyle, pycnostyle, stylite, Stylites, stylobate, styloid, stylolite, stylus, systyle
su-, sut-	sew	Latin	suere, sutus	couture, suture
suad-, suas-	urge	Latin	suadere, suasus	persuasion
suav-	sweet	Latin	suavis	assuage, suave, suavity
sub-, su-, suf-, sug-, sup-, sus-	below	Latin	sub	submarine, submerge, suffix, suggest, support
subter-	under	Latin	subter	subterfuge
sucr-	sugar	Latin	succarum	sucrose
sud-	sweat	Latin	sudare	exudate, exude, sudarium, sudoriferous, transudate
sui-	self	Latin	sui	sui generis, suicide
sulc-	furrow	Latin	sulcus	sulcus
sum-	sum	Latin	summare "to sum up", from summa "sum"	consummate, consummation, sum, summa cum laude, summary, summation
sum-, sumpt-	take	Latin	sumere, sumptus	assume, assumption, consume, consumption, presumption, subsume
super-	above, over	Latin	super	insuperable, soprano, sovereign, summit, superable, superb, supercilious, supercomputer, superficial, superfluous, superimpose, superior, superlative, supermarket, supernal, supernatural, supernova, superposition, superpower, superscript, supersede, supersonic, superstition, supervene, supervise, supreme, supremum, surname, surplus, surround, survive
supin-	lying back	Latin	supinus	supination, supine
supra-	above, over	Latin	supra	supranationalism
surd-	deaf	Latin	surdus	absurdity
surg-	rise	Latin	surgere	insurgent, insurrection, resurgent, resurrection
sybar-	Sybaris	Greek	Σύβαρις, συβάρεως, Συβαρίτης Sybarī́tēs, Συβαριτικός	Sybarite, sybaritic, sybaritism
syc-	fig	Greek	συκῆ, σῦκον (sûkon)	sycomancy, sycophant
syn-, sy-, syg-, syl-, sym-, sys-	with	Greek	σύν (sún)	syllogism, symbol, symmetry, sympathy, synonym, synchronous, system
syring-	pipe	Greek	σύριγξ, σύριγγος (súrinx, súringos)	syringe, Syringodea, Syringoderma, Syringogaster, syringoma, syringomyelia, syrinx
