= Clastic dike =

Body of sedimentary rock cutting vertically across rock layers

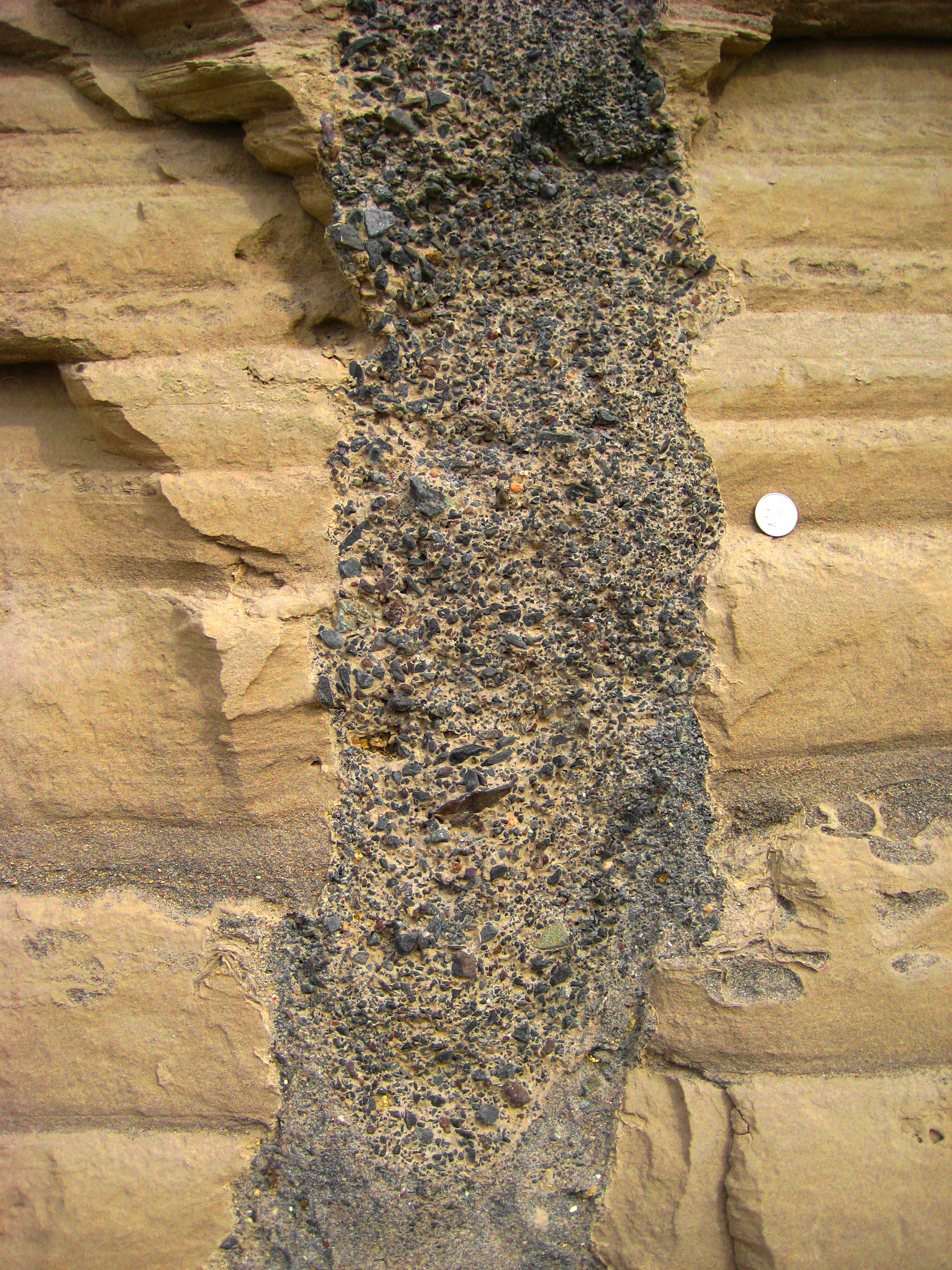
Vertical clastic dike, filled with coarse basaltic sand, cuts lighter-colored horizontal beds composed of finer grained material. Quarter for scale.

A clastic dike is a seam of sedimentary material that fills an open fracture in and cuts across sedimentary rock strata or layering in other rock types.

Clastic dikes form rapidly by fluidized injection (mobilization of pressurized pore fluids) or passively by water, wind, and gravity (sediment swept into open cracks). Diagenesis may play a role in the formation of some dikes. Clastic dikes are commonly vertical or near-vertical. Centimeter-scale widths are common, but thicknesses range from millimetres to metres. Length is usually many times width.

Clastic dikes are found in sedimentary basin deposits worldwide. Formal geologic reports of clastic dikes began to emerge in the early 19th century.

Terms synonymous with clastic dike include: clastic intrusion, sandstone dike, fissure fill, soft-sediment deformation, fluid escape structure, seismite, injectite, liquefaction feature, neptunian dike (passive fissure fills), paleoseismic indicator, pseudo ice wedge cast, sedimentary insertion, sheeted clastic dike, synsedimentary filling, tension fracture, hydraulic injection dike, and tempestite.

== Environments of formation ==
Clastic dike environments include:

- Clastic dikes associated with earthquakes –

A large variety of dikes are found in the geologic record. However, clastic dikes are typically produced by seismic disturbance and liquefaction of high water content sediments. Examples of this type are many. Clastic dikes are paleoseismic indicators in certain geologic settings. Several qualitative, field-based systems have been developed to help distinguish seismites from soft sediment deformation features formed by non-seismic processes.

Results from analytical modeling of clastic dike injection in soft rocks indicate propagation occurred at a rate of approximately 4 to 65 m/s at driving pressures of 1–2 MPa. Emplacement duration (<2 s) is similar to the speed with which acoustic energy (pressure waves) moves through partially lithified sedimentary rock.

- Clastic dikes associated with debris flows –

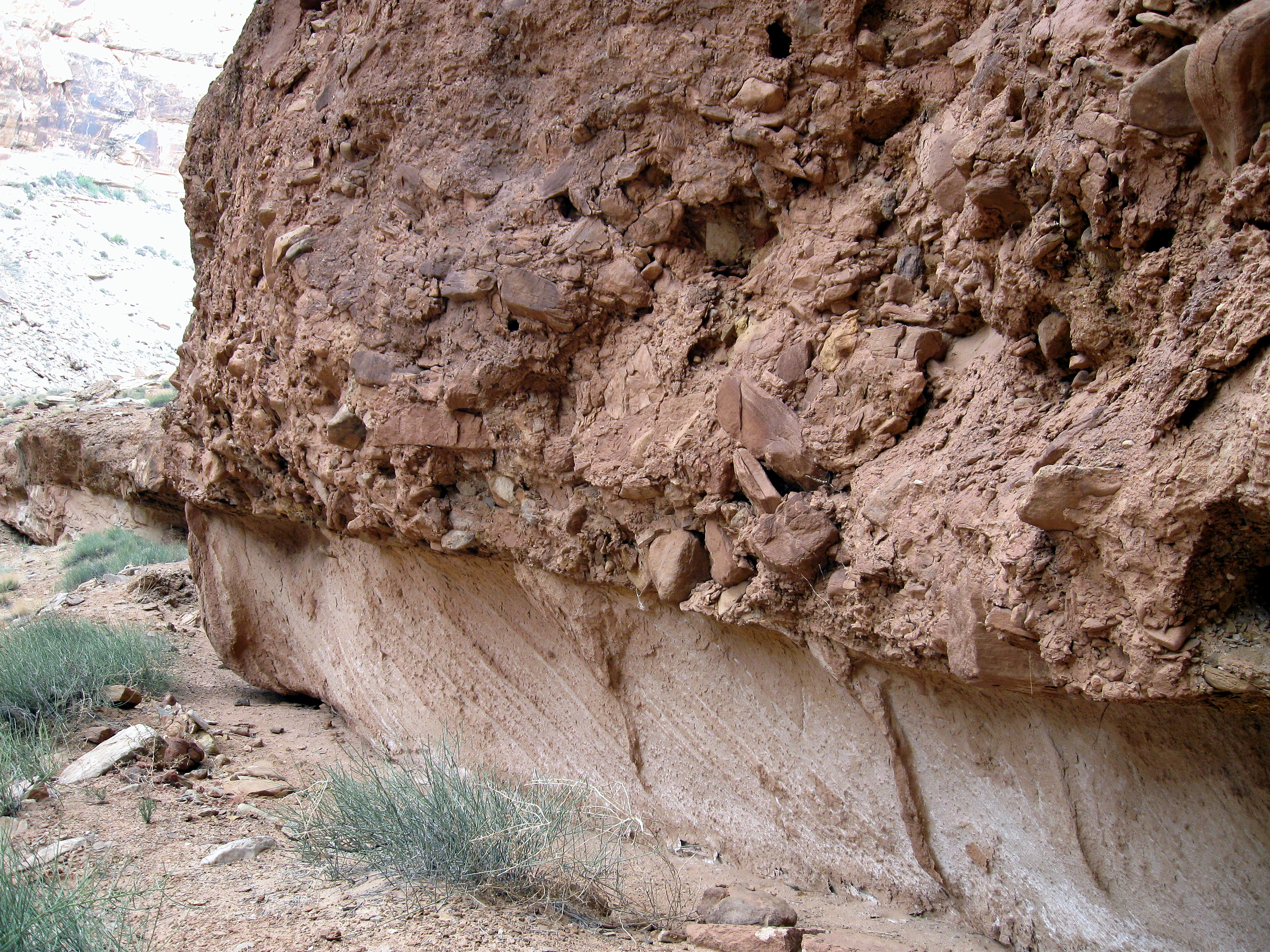
Red-colored clastic dikes injected downward into light-colored sediment beneath a debris flow. Black Dragon Wash, San Rafael Swell, Utah

Sandstone dikes formed by downward injection are found along Black Dragon wash upstream of the famous petroglyphs area, San Rafael Swell, Utah.

- Clastic dikes associated with impact craters –

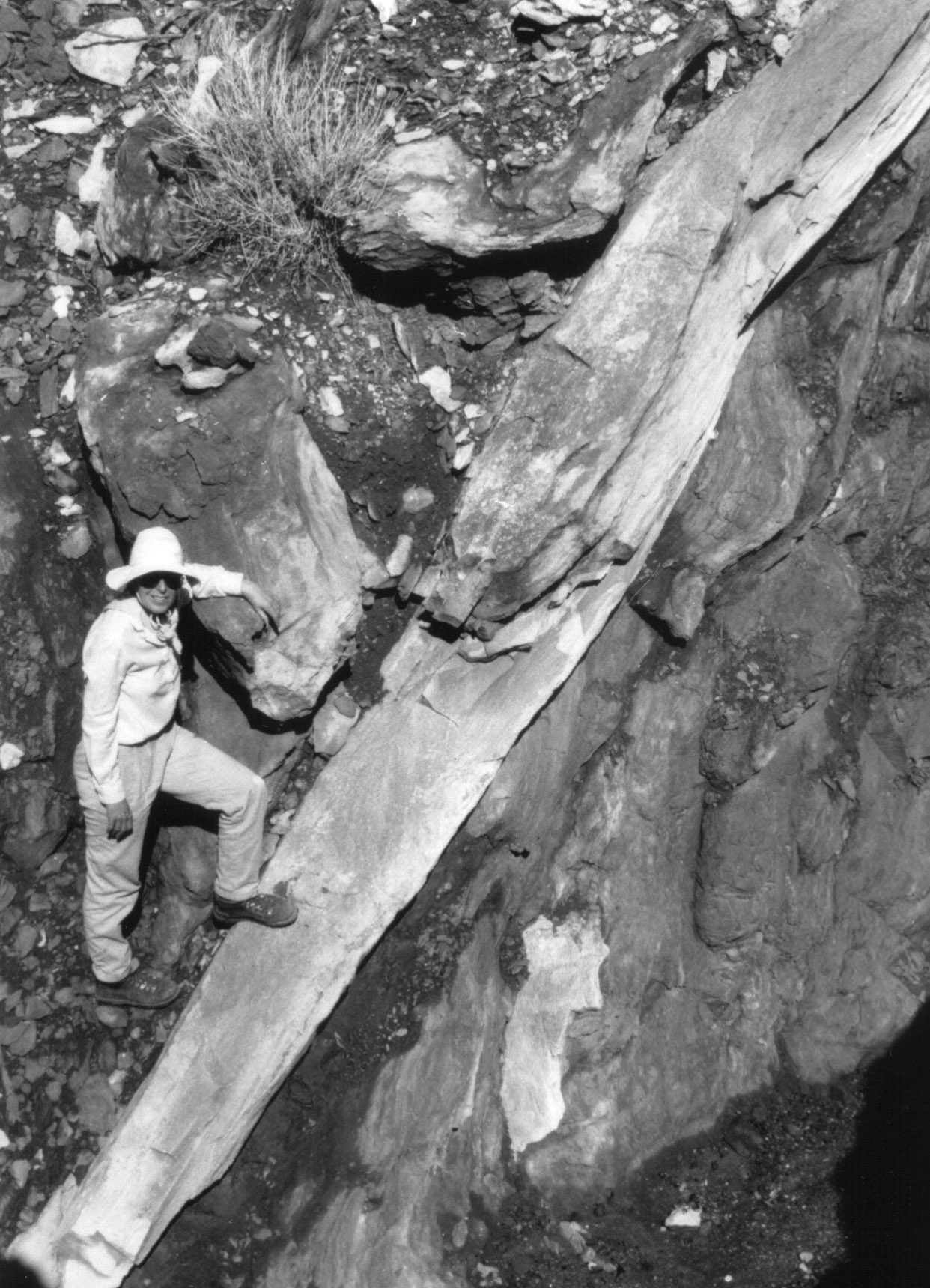
Clastic dike exposed on the east flank of the central peak of Upheaval Dome, Canyonlands, Utah. The sandstone dike was injected downsection from the White Rim Sandstone into the Organ Rock Shale during the earliest part of the impact crater excavation stage. The dike is made of cataclastically broken sand grains derived from the White Rim Sandstone. The slightly overturned Organ Rock beds dip steeply to the left and their tops face toward the right. The White Rim Sandstone, folded to vertical, lies just off the photo to the right. View is to the north. P.W. Huntoon Collection.

Sandstone dikes with cataclastically deformed sand grains, sourced in the Permian White Rim Sandstone, are found within Upheaval Dome, Canyonlands National Park, Utah, at Roberts Rift, and elsewhere. Commonly, the fill is composed of angular grains, evidence that the injected material was lithified prior to impact and was crushed during injection into fractures (preexisting or impact-formed).

- Clastic dikes associated with salt domes –

Clastic dike swarms associated with salt dome diapirism are reported from the Dead Sea region.

- Clastic dikes associated with glaciers –

Sand injection features are reported to have formed under heavy loads and confining pressures beneath grounding glacial ice.

- Clastic dikes in resistant bedrock –

Though unusual, a significant number of reports describe sedimentary material intruding fractured crystalline bedrock, usually within fault zones. Some of the articles referenced here describe lithified clastic dikes.

- Clastic dikes in storm deposits –

Cyclic stresses from large waves can cause wet sediments to fluidize, forming various types of soft sediment deformation features including clastic dikes.

=== Clastic dikes in the Columbia Basin ===
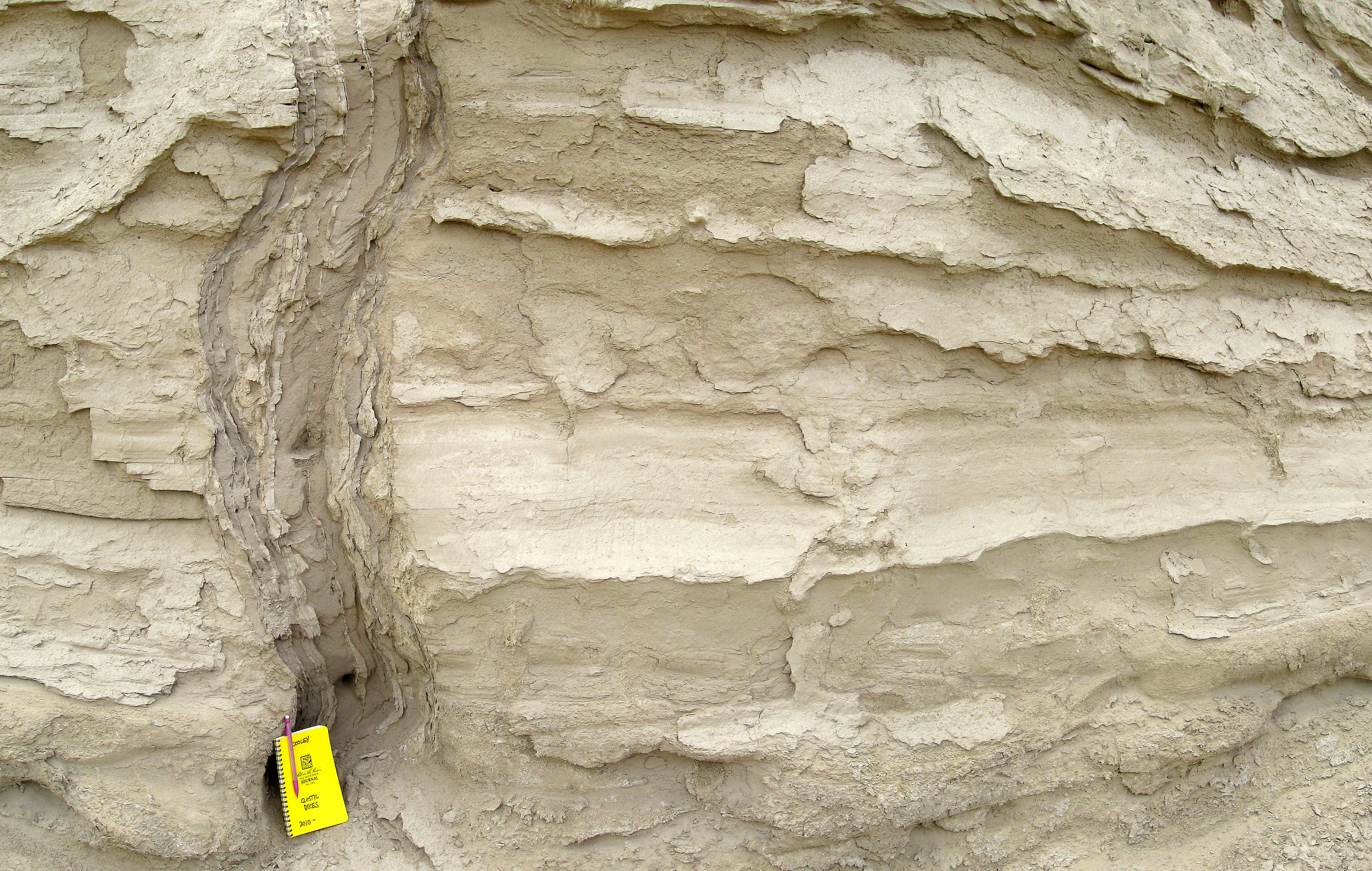
Vertically sheeted clastic dike typical of those found in rhythmically bedded Missoula floods slackwater deposits of the Columbia Basin. Yellow field book for scale. Willow Creek Valley at Cecil (Oregon).

Tens of thousands of clastic dikes (1 mm–350 cm wide, up to 50 m deep) penetrate sedimentary and bedrock units in the Columbia Basin of Washington, Oregon and Idaho. Their origin remains in question. The dikes may be related to loading by outburst floods. Other evidence suggests they are sediment-filled desiccation cracks (mudcracks). Some have suggested the dikes are ice wedge casts or features related to the melting of buried ice. Earthquake shaking and liquefaction are also suggested to explain the dikes (i.e., sand blows).

The silt-, sand-, and gravel-filled dikes in the Columbia Basin are primarily sourced in the Touchet Formation (or the Touchet-equivalent Willamette Silt) and intrude downward into older geologic units, including:

- Pleistocene hillslope colluvium with developed caliche horizons in the Umatilla Basin near Alderdale, Washington
- Pleistocene landslide deposits along Hwy 14 in the Columbia Gorge (Umatilla Basin)
- Pleistocene Clearwater Gravels in the Lewiston Basin
- "Pre-late Wisconsin" outburst flood and flood-related deposits (includes the "ancient cataclysmic flood deposits" of Allen et al., 2009) in the Walla Walla Valley/Pasco Basin and Columbia Gorge
- Post-basalt basin fill sediments (Dalles Group, etc.) exposed in tributary stream valleys downstream of Wallula Gap
- Miocene-Pliocene Snipes Mountain Conglomerate in the Yakima Valley at Granger, Washington
- Miocene-Pliocene Ringold Formation in the Pasco Basin
- Miocene-Pliocene Ellensburg Formation at Craig's Hill near Ellensburg, Washington (outside Missoula flood track)
- Miocene-Pliocene Ellensburg Formation at Foster Coulee (WDFW Foster Ck Wildlife Area) near Bridgeport, Washington
- Miocene Columbia River Basalt (CRB) in the Walla Walla Valley and Pasco Basin at Gable Mountain
- Latah Formation (interbeds in CRBs) west of Finley, Washington along Hwy 397 and elsewhere

In 1925, Olaf P. Jenkins described the clastic dikes of eastern Washington state as follows:

It appears, then, that in every case fissures formed and then fragmental materials are dropped, washed, or pressed into them, from above, below, or from the sides. This action has taken place in open fissures; under water in fissures on the bed of the sea or other bodies of water; and also far below the surface of the earth in consolidated rocks. The filling from below has come about by pressure of some sort, in some cases undoubtedly hydrostatic.

== See also ==
- Dike (geology)
- Igneous intrusion#Dikes
- Sheeted dyke complex
