= Speleoseismite =

Seismically separated speleothem

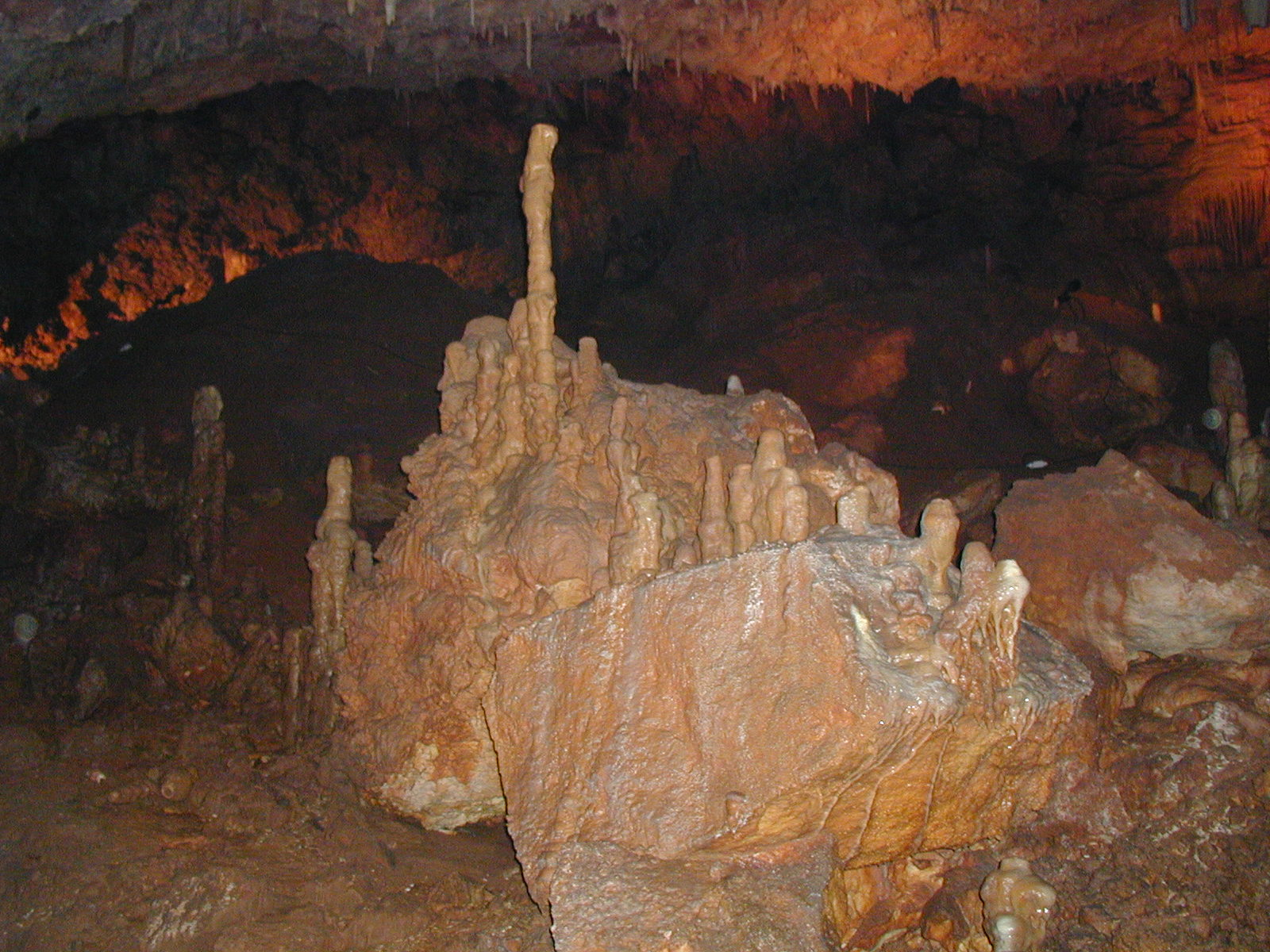
Collapsed cave ceiling

Diagram of dripstone cave structures (speleoseismites labelled AD)

A speleoseismite is a damaged speleothem (cave deposit) argued to have been deformed by a seismic event (an earthquake). Speleoseismites can include severed stalagmites (those growing from the floor), fallen stalactites (those growing from the ceiling of caves), collapsed cave ceilings, tilted speleothems, change in growth axis of speleothems, stalactite-stalagmite pair displaced from one another and others. These seismites can be used in paleoseismological studies of ancient earthquakes.
