= Araeostyle =

Araeostyle (Latin: araeostylos, from Ancient Greek: ἀραιόστυλος, from αραιος, "weak" or "widely spaced", and Ancient Greek: στυλος, "column") is one of five categories of intercolumniation (the spacing between the columns of a colonnade) described by the Roman architect Vitruvius. Of all the ancient architectural categories, the araeostyle has the widest spacing of columns, with an intercolumniation equal to four column diameters. Because of the wide span, timber rather than stone architraves were used. Vitruvius names three examples of araeostyle temples: the Temple of Ceres, Pompey's Temple of Hercules, and the Temple on the Capitoline Hill.
