= Spaz (disambiguation) =

Spaz is a derogatory description that evolved from spastic.

Spaz or spazz may also refer to:

== Music ==
- Spazz (band), an American musical group
- "Spaz" (song), a 2008 single by N.E.R.D.
- "Spaz", a 2019 song by Bhad Bhabie
- "Spazz", a song by Stephen Malkmus and the Jicks from the album Mirror Traffic

== Other uses ==
- Patrick Spaziante, comic book artist known professionally as "Spaz"
- Steve Williams (animator) (born 1962), Canadian visual effects artist
- Space Pirates and Zombies (S.P.A.Z.), a video game
- Spaz Jackrabbit, a video character from the Jazz Jackrabbit series

== See also ==
- Spastic (disambiguation)
