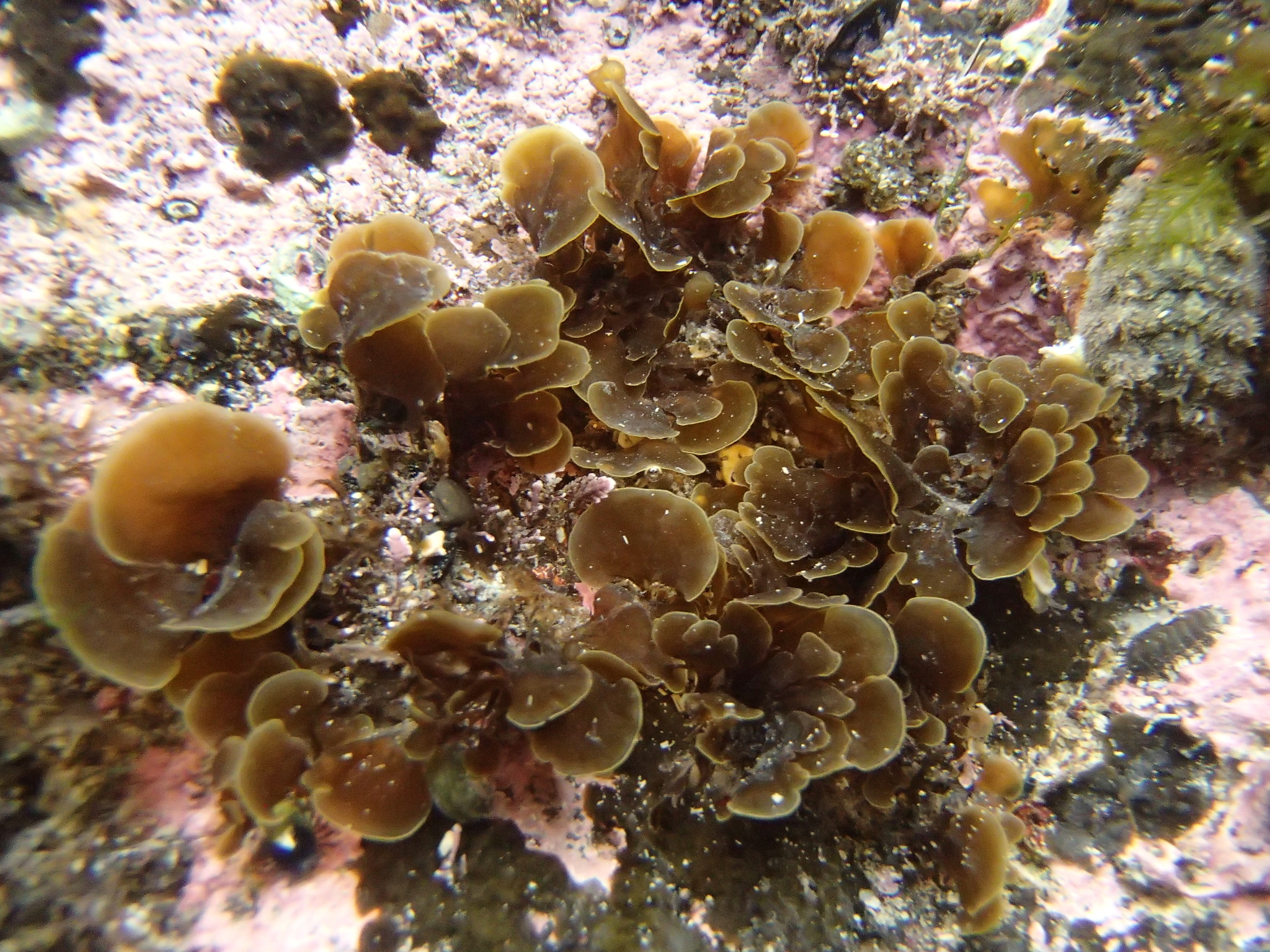
- Microzonia velutina

Scientific classification
- Domain: Eukaryota
- Clade: Diaphoretickes
- Clade: SAR
- Clade: Stramenopiles
- Phylum: Gyrista
- Subphylum: Ochrophytina
- Class: Phaeophyceae
- Subclass: Dictyotophycidae
- Order: Syringodermatales; E.C. Henry
- Family: Syringodermataceae; E.C. Henry

Genera
- Microzonia; Syringoderma

= Syringodermataceae =

Family of algae

Syringodermataceae is a family of brown algae. It includes two genera, Microzonia and Syringoderma.
