= Spastic =

Spastic can refer to:

- Spasticity, a feature of altered muscle performance
- A historical reference to people with the movement disorders, see cerebral palsy
- Spastic (word), a pejorative used against disabled people

== See also ==
- Scope (charity), formerly known as The Spastics Society, a British disability charity
- "Spasticus Autisticus", a 1981 song by English singer Ian Dury
- Spaz (disambiguation)
- Cerebral Palsy Alliance, formerly known as the Spastic Centre, an Australian not for profit organisation
- scosa, the Spastic Centres of South Australia Inc., now merged into another organisation
