= Temple of Hercules Pompeianus =

Temple in Rome

The Temple of Hercules Pompeianus (Latin: aedes Herculis Pompeiani) was a temple dedicated to Hercules in ancient Rome near the circus Maximus. Vitruvius (III.3.5) refers to it being decorated in the Tuscan manner. It contained a statue of Hercules by Myron. 'Pompeianus' may indicate either that it was an older building built by the Pompeius family or that it was restored by Pompey the Great. It seems to be linked to Republican-era tufa foundations discovered under Santa Maria in Cosmedin.

== See also ==
- List of Ancient Roman temples

== Bibliography ==
- Platner and Ashby, A Topographical Dictionary of Ancient Rome, 1929, p. 255-256
- Burgess, The topography and antiquities of Rome, p 141
