= Intercolumniation =

Spacing between columns in a colonnade

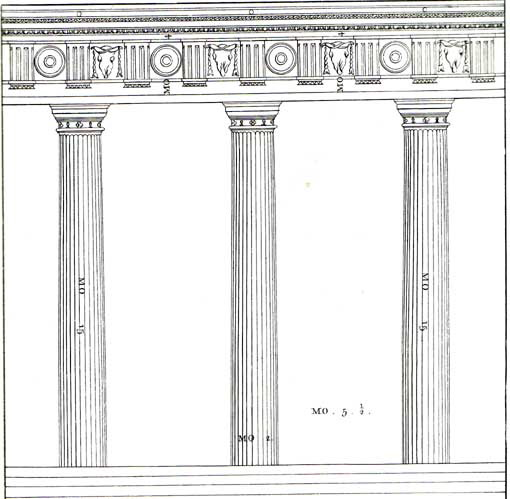
Illustration from The Four Books of Architecture by Andrea Palladio, translation by Thomas Ware published in London, 1738

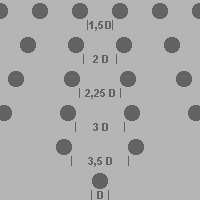
The sequence of expanding intercolumniations, showing Pycnostyle ( I = 1.5D), Systyle ( I = 2D), Eustyle ( I = 2.25D), Diastyle ( I = 3D), and Araeostyle ( I = +3.5D). In the figure, I = Intercolumniation; D = Diameter of the column.

In architecture, intercolumniation is the proportional spacing between columns in a colonnade, often expressed as a multiple of the column diameter as measured at the bottom of the shaft. In Classical, Renaissance, and Baroque architecture, intercolumniation was determined by a system described by the first-century BC Roman architect Vitruvius (Vitruvius, De architectura, iii.3.3-10).

Vitruvius named five systems of intercolumniation (Pycnostyle, Systyle, Eustyle, Diastyle, and Araeostyle), and warned that when columns are placed three column-diameters or more apart, stone architraves break.

According to Vitruvius, the Hellenistic architect Hermogenes (ca. 200 BC) formulated these proportions ("symmetriae") and perfected the Eustyle arrangement, which has an enlarged bay in the center of the façade.

== Standard intercolumniations ==
The standard intercolumniations are:

Pycnostyle
One and a half diameters
Systyle
Two diameters
Eustyle
Two and a quarter diameters (and three diameters between middle columns front and rear); considered by Vitruvius to be the best proportion.
Diastyle
Three diameters
Araeostyle
Four or more diameters, requiring a wooden architrave rather than one of stone
Araeosystyle
Alternating araeostyle and systyle

Vitruvius's definitions seem to apply only to examples with which he was acquainted in Rome, or to Greek temples described by authors he had studied. In the earlier Doric temples the intercolumniation is sometimes less than one diameter, and it increases gradually as the style developed; thus in the Parthenon it is 1 1/4, in the Temple of Diana Propylaea at Eleusis, 1 1/4; and in the portico at Delos, 2 1/2.

The intercolumniations of the columns of the Ionic order are greater, averaging 2 diameters, but then the relative proportion of height to diameter in the column has to be taken into account, as also the width of the peristyle.

Thus in the temple of Apollo Branchidae, where the columns are slender and over 10 diameters in height, the intercolumniation is 1 3/4, notwithstanding its late date, and in the Temple of Apollo Smintheus in Asia Minor, in which the peristyle is pseudodipteral, or double width, the intercolumniation is just over 1 1/2. Temples of the Corinthian order follow the proportions of those of the Ionic order.

== See also ==
- List of architecture topics
- Architectural glossary
