= Seismite =

Sediment/structure shaken seismically

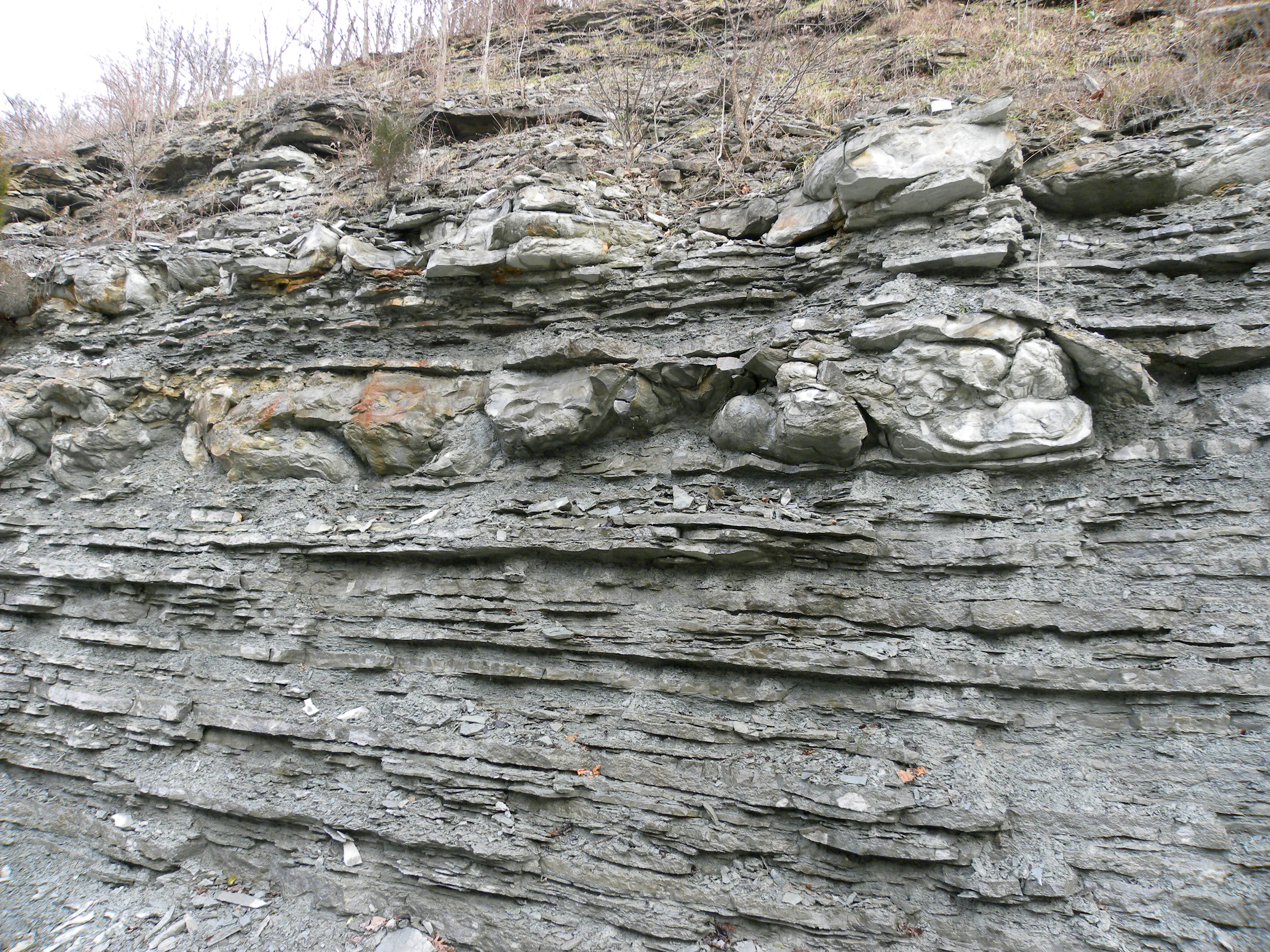
Seismites in the Upper Ordovician of northern Kentucky.

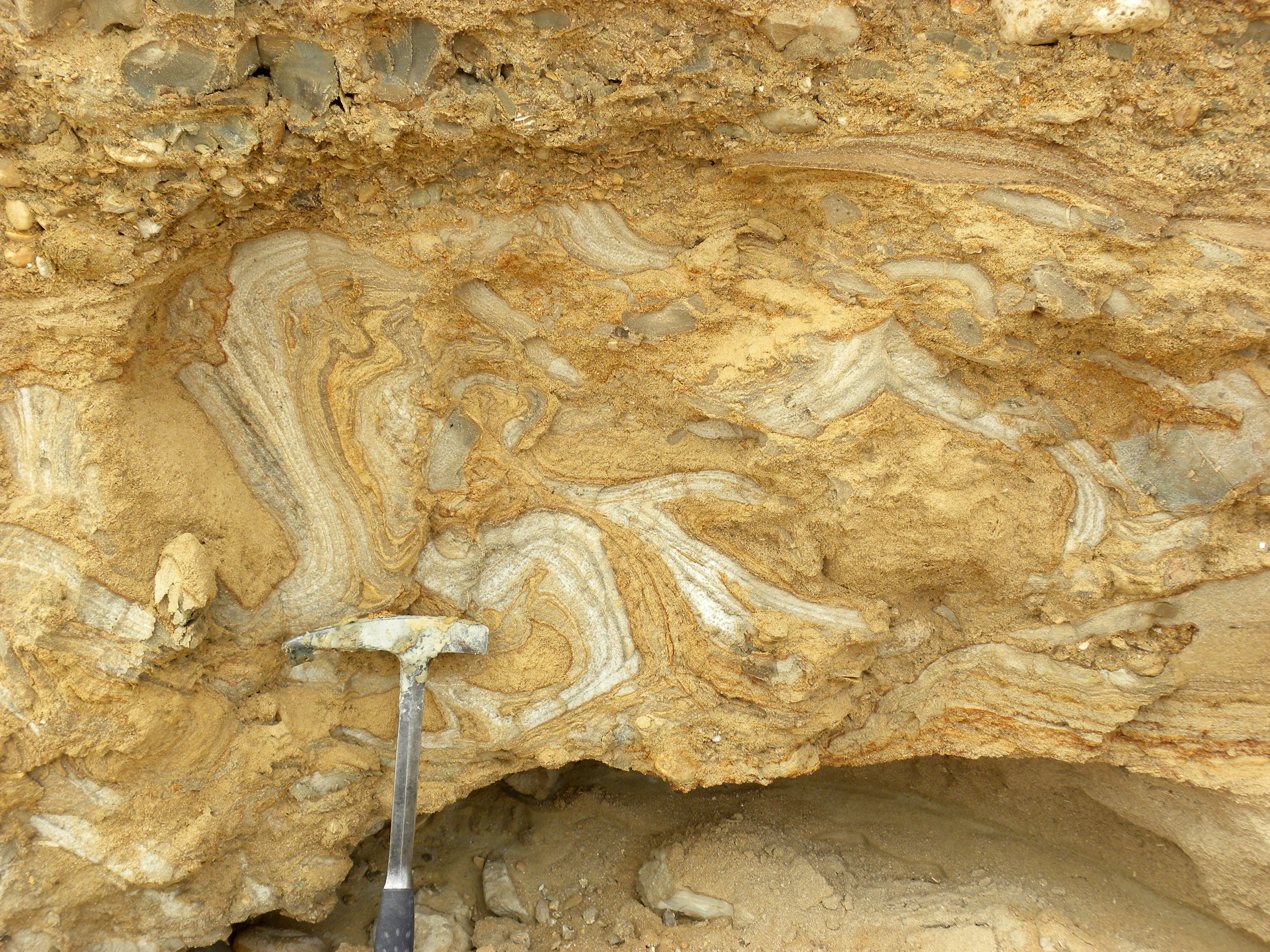
Seismite in Holocene sediments of the Dead Sea basin, Israel.

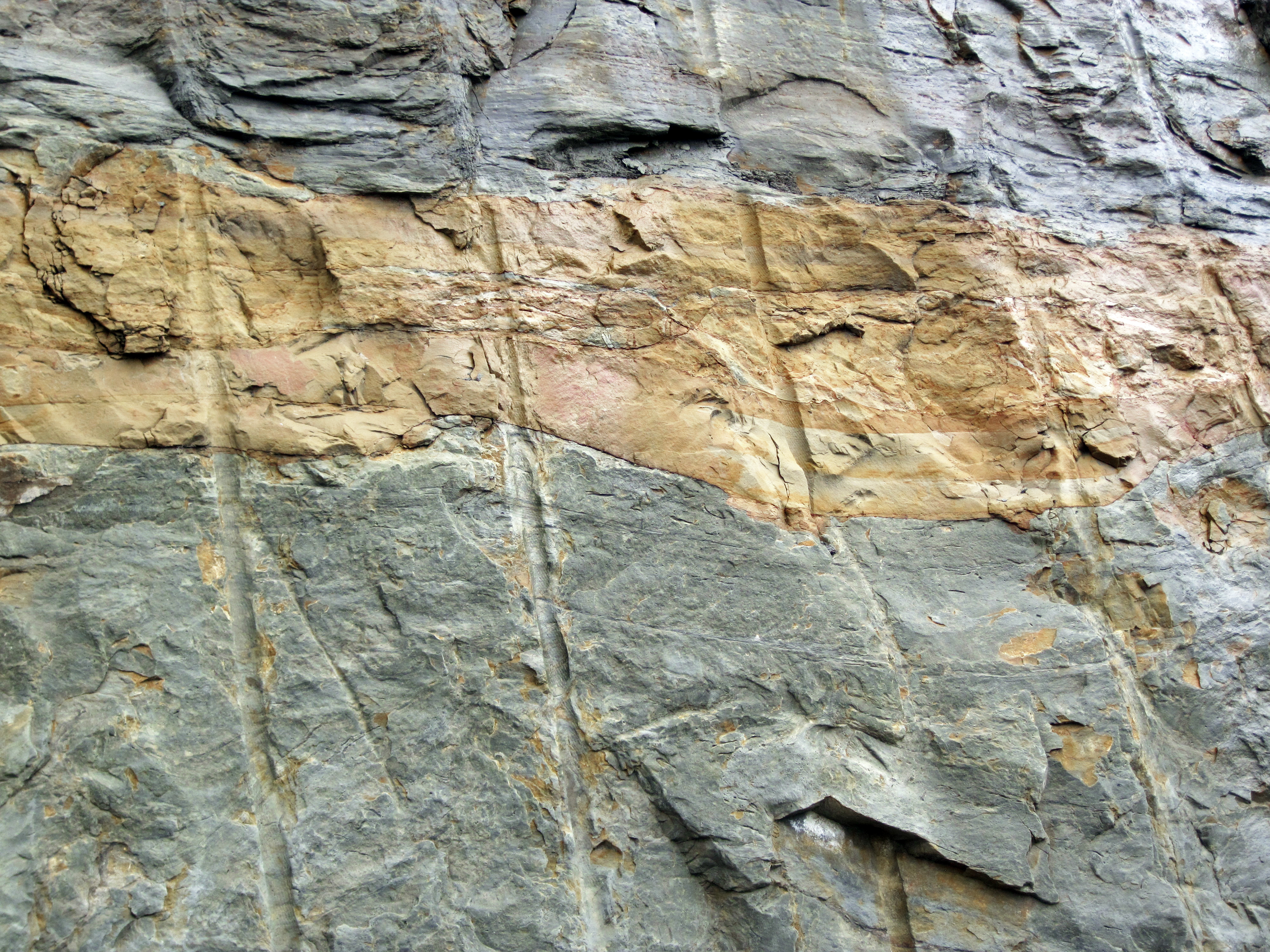
Seismite in the Borden Formation, Ohio, demonstrating "flow rolls".

Seismites are sedimentary beds and structures deformed by seismic shaking. The German paleontologist Adolf Seilacher first used the term in 1969 to describe earthquake-deformed layers. Today, the term is applied to both sedimentary layers and soft sediment deformation structures formed by shaking. This subtle change in usage accommodates structures that may not remain within a layer (i.e., clastic dikes or sand volcanos).

Caution is urged when applying the term to features observed in the field, as similar-looking features may be products of either seismic or non-seismic perturbation. Several informal classification systems exist to help geologists distinguish seismites from other soft-sediment deformation features, though a formal, standardized system has not been developed.

Geologists use seismites, in combination with other evidence, to better understand the earthquake history of an area. If age and distribution of seismically-generated features can be determined, then recurrence interval and seismic hazard risk can be assessed.

== See also ==
- Speleoseismite
- Soft-sediment deformation structures
