= Syringoderma =

Scientific classification
- Domain: Eukaryota
- Clade: Sar
- Clade: Stramenopiles
- Division: Ochrophyta
- Class: Phaeophyceae
- Order: Syringodermatales
- Family: Syringodermataceae
- Genus: Syringoderma; Levring

Species
- Syringoderma abyssicola Syringoderma australe Syringoderma floridana Syringoderma phinneyi

Genus of brown algae

Syringoderma is a genus in the family Syringodermataceae of the brown algae (class Phaeophyceae). The genus contains four species.
