= Upheaval Dome =

Geological feature in Utah, United States

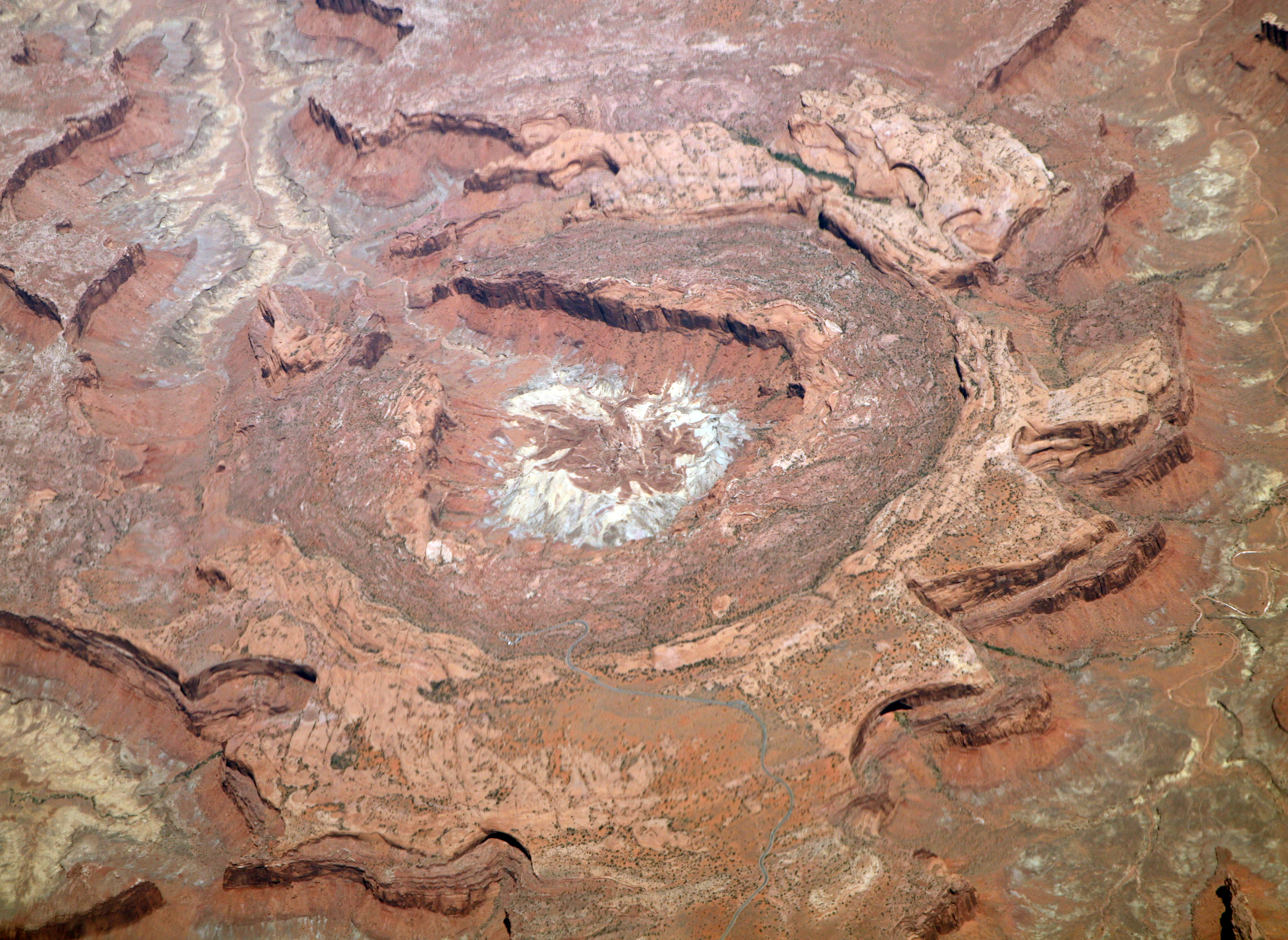
- Oblique aerial view of Upheaval Dome, 2012

- Location within the United States Location within Utah
- Location: San Juan County, Utah, United States; 38°26′13″N 109°55′45″W

Impact crater structure
- Confidence: Unconfirmed
- Diameter: c. 10 km
- Age: c. 170 million years
- Exposed: Yes
- Drilled: Yes

Upheaval Dome is an enigmatic geological structure in San Juan County, Utah, United States, that has been variously interpreted as a meteorite impact structure or a salt dome. The structure lies 22 miles (35 km) southwest of the city of Moab, Utah, in the Island in the Sky section of Canyonlands National Park.

== Description ==
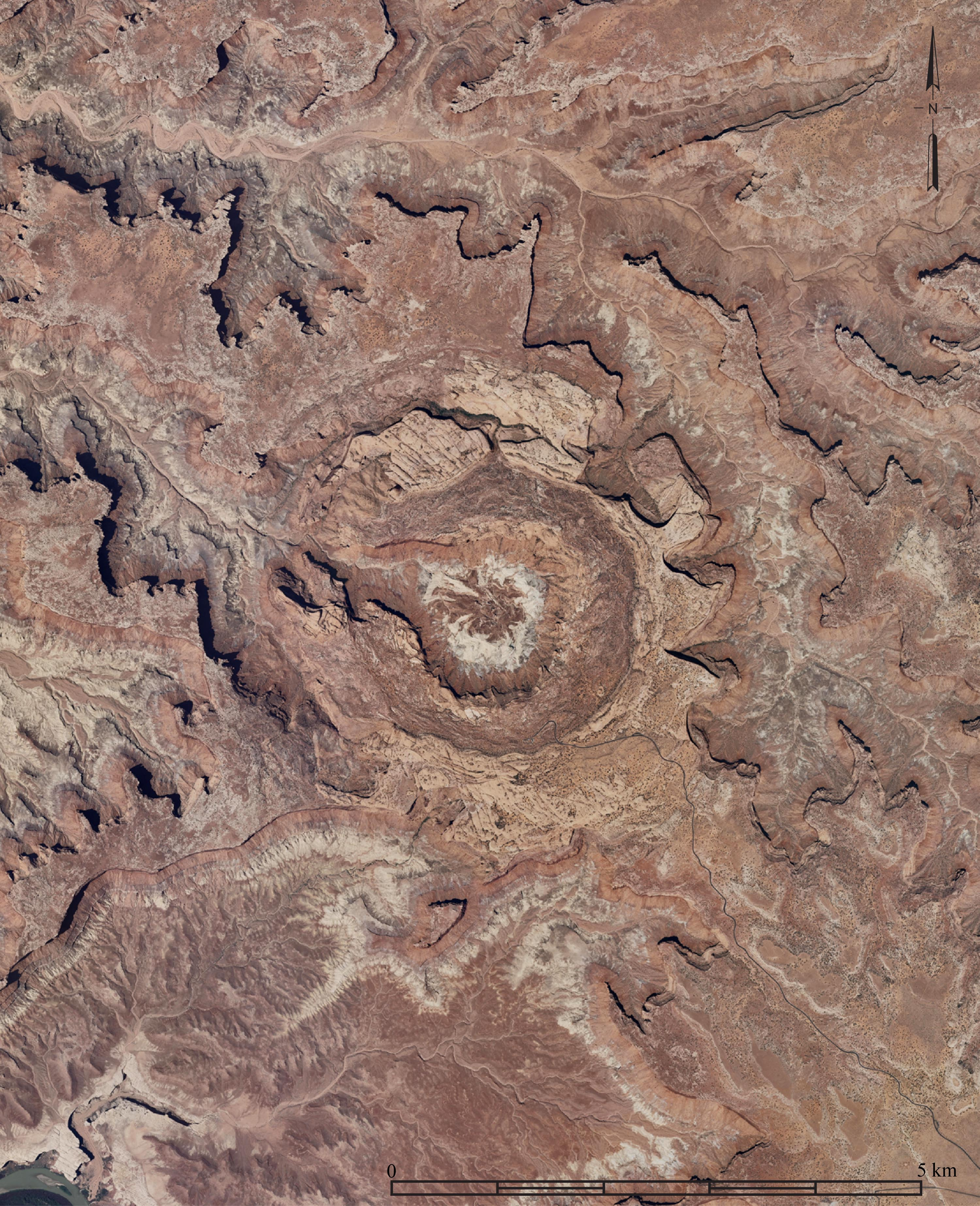
Aerial orthophoto, 2011. Note scale at lower right.

Upheaval Dome is around 10 km (6.2 mi) in diameter and the crater is known to be less than 170 million years old (Jurassic or younger, but how much younger is not established.) The crater is clearly visible on the surface as light and dark brown concentric rings.

Stratigraphically, the oldest formation exposed in the center of the dome is the Permian Organ Rock Shale. This is overlain by the Permian White Rim Sandstone. Both are sometimes considered part of the Cutler Formation. Overlying these are the Triassic Moenkopi Formation (which is bounded top and bottom by unconformities), the Chinle Formation, the cliff-forming Wingate Sandstone, the Kayenta Formation, and the crossbedded Triassic-Jurassic Navajo Sandstone.

Structurally, the dome is anomalous. Most of the rock strata of Canyonlands National Park are flat-lying or gently dipping with the exception of a series of linear salt walls and associated synclines. Upheaval Dome is a circular, dome-shaped structure. Some strata near the center are nearly vertical in orientation. Dips of 70 degrees have been measured in the Kayenta Formation on the U-shaped plateau surrounding the center of the structure. A syncline surrounds the center, where the axis forms a complete circle approximately two miles across. The syncline is primarily visible in the Navajo Sandstone. Another anticline has been mapped to the north of this ring syncline, which is also concentric with it.

There were two well-known theories as to the origin of the upheaval. One theory was the upheaval is a salt dome, an anticlinal structure which occurs when a salt diapir is pushed up by the weight of overlying rocks.

The currently accepted theory is an interpretation of the dome as an eroded impact crater, like the much younger Meteor Crater near Winslow, Arizona. In the 1990s, a team of geologists and seismologists from NASA and the University of Nevada at Reno performed a detailed study that included seismic refraction and rock mapping. The results of this study support the meteorite theory. In 2008, it was announced that shocked quartz was discovered in addition to the numerous impact-related features described by Kriens et al. in 1998.

== Gallery ==
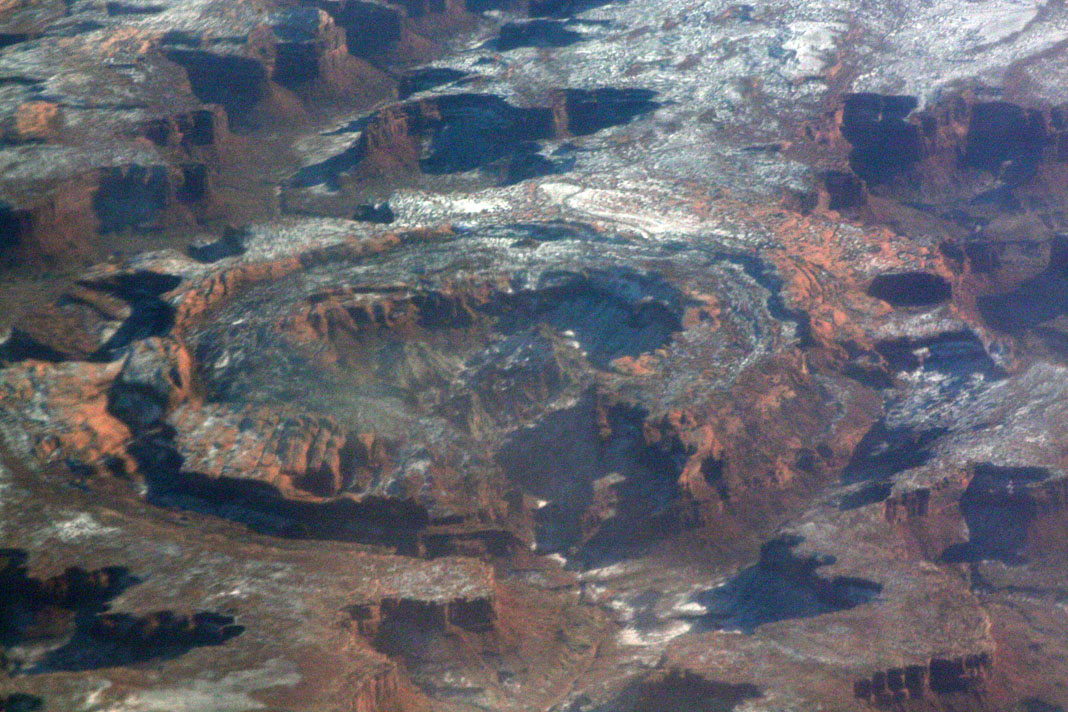
Oblique air photo facing southeast from around 30,000 feet

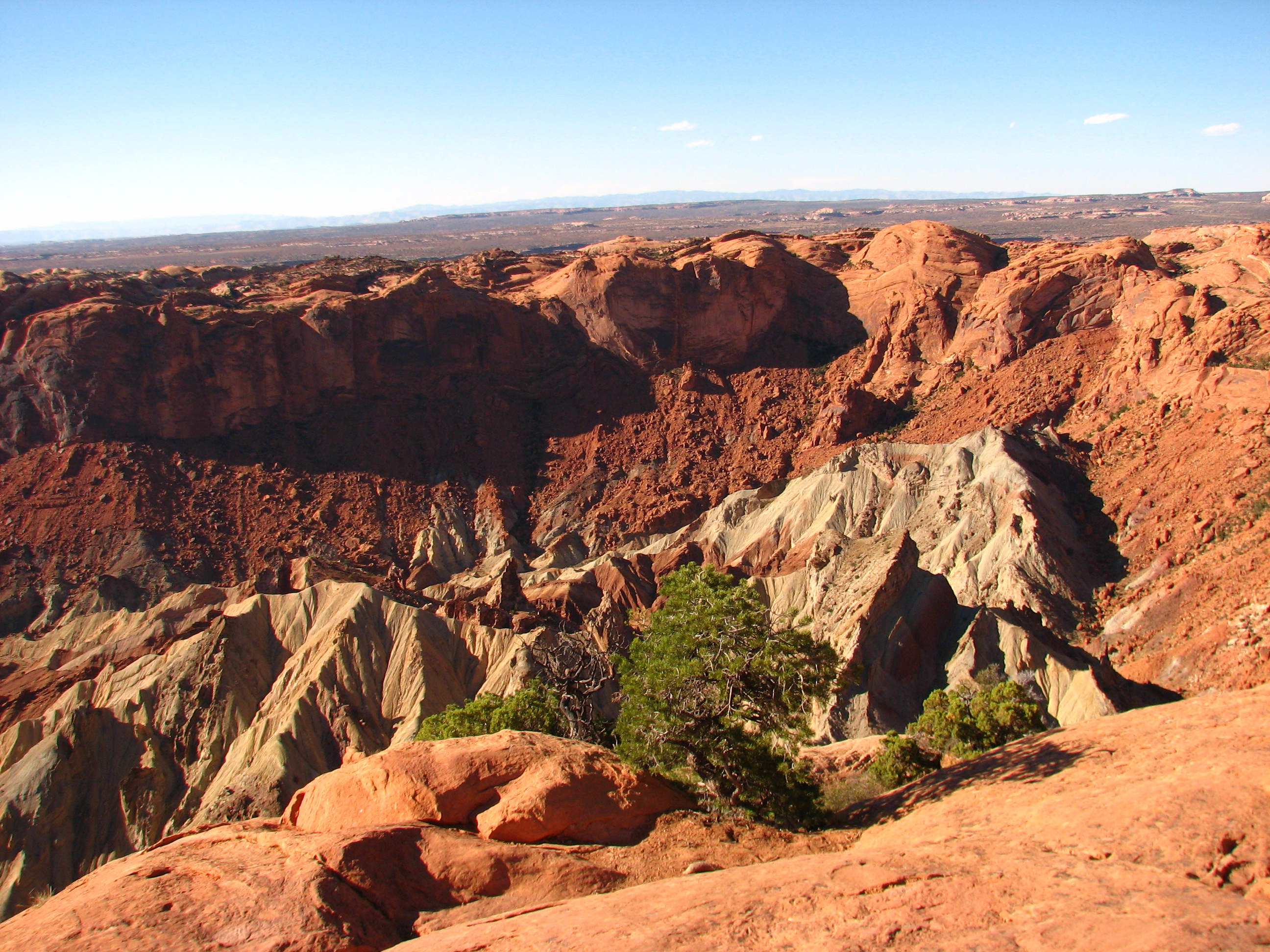
Upheaval Dome as seen from the rim of the structure

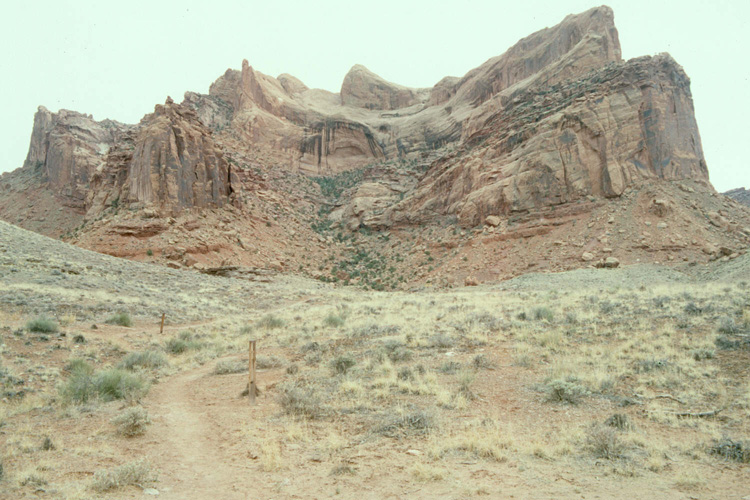
Syncline in Navajo Sandstone visible from the Syncline Campsite on the northwest side of the structure, facing south

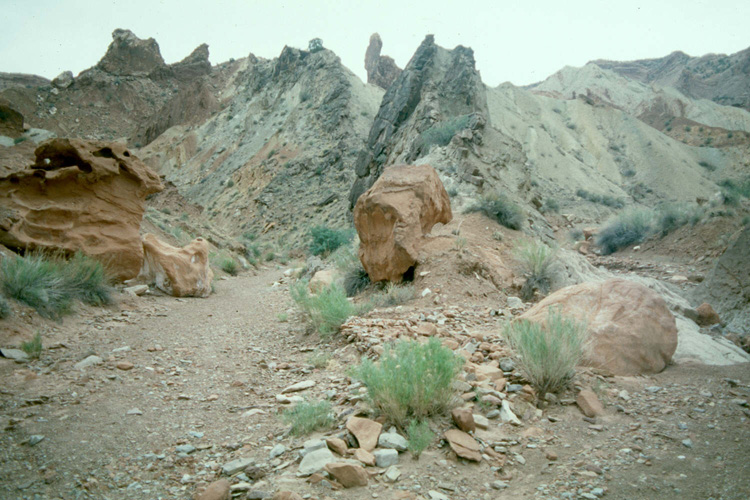
Steeply dipping rock strata near the center of the dome

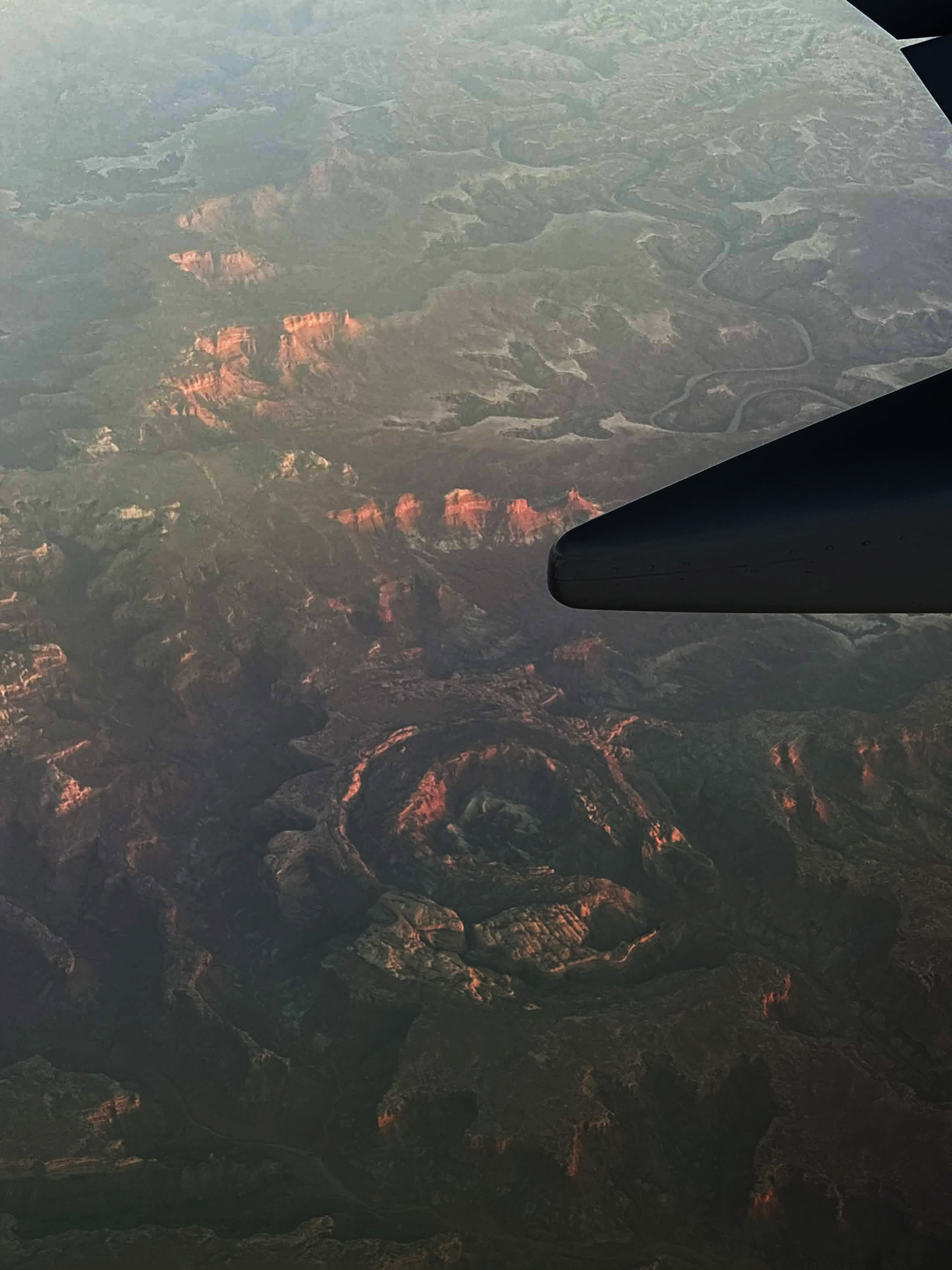
As seen from 30,000 feet in the context of the rest of the landscape
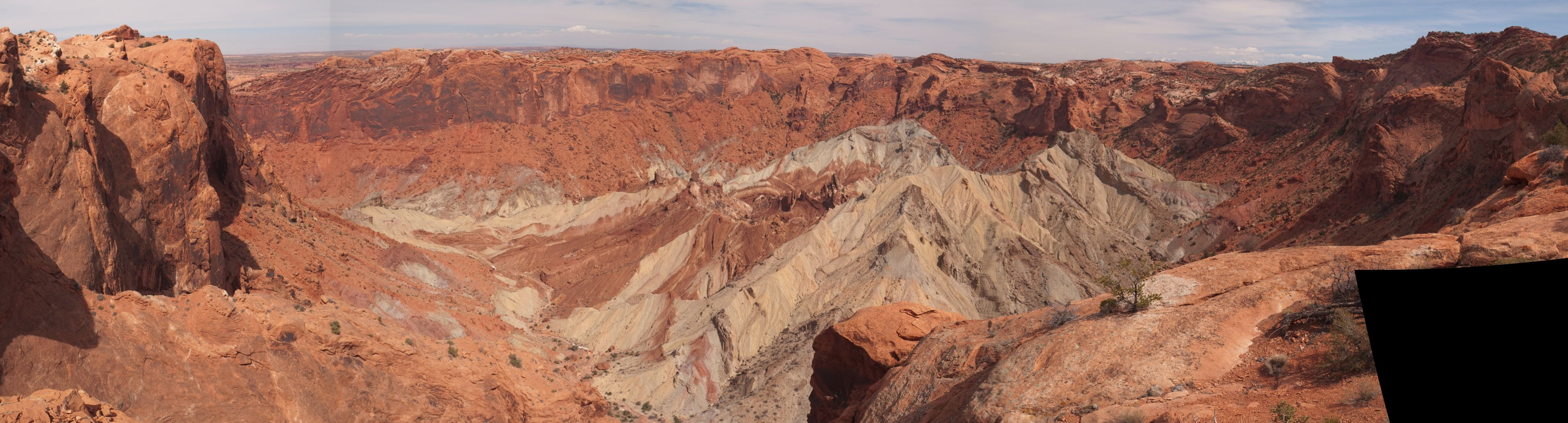
Panoramic photo of the dome taken from the second overlook point on the Upheaval Dome overlook trail
