= Alderdale, Washington =

Ghost town in Washington (state)

- Ghost town
- Location within Washington (state) Location within the United States
- Coordinates: 45°50′05″N 119°55′15″W
- Country: United States
- State: Washington
- County: Klickitat
- Established: 1907
- Time zone: UTC-8 (Pacific (PST))
  - Summer (DST): UTC-7 (PDT)

Alderdale is an extinct town in Klickitat County, in the U.S. state of Washington. The GNIS classifies it as a populated place.

A post office called Alderdale was established in 1907, and remained in operation until 1962. In 1917 it was reported as a station on the Spokane, Portland and Seattle Railway. The community took its name from nearby Alder Creek.

		—
		—
		—
		—
		—
1900	Unknown	
1910	Unknown	
1920	327	
1930	Unknown	
1940	Unknown	
1950	Unknown	
1960	Unknown	
1970	Unknown	
1980	Unknown	
1990	Unknown	
2000	Unknown	
2010	Unknown	
2020	Unknown	
2023 (est.)	Unknown	
