= Paleoseismology =

Study of earthquakes that happened in the past

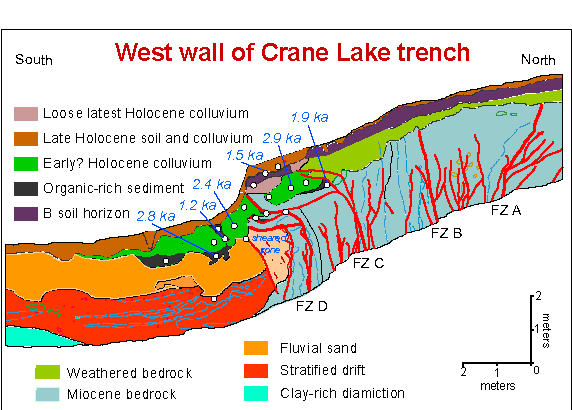
Sketch of trench wall

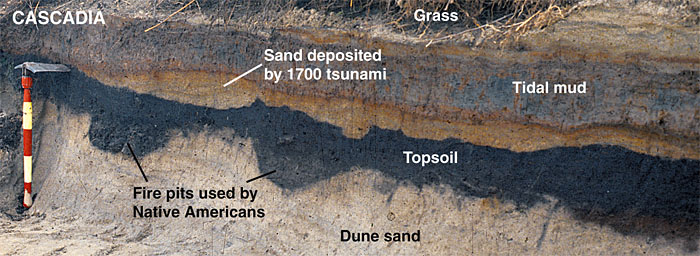
Sandsheet thought to have resulted from the tsunami caused by an earthquake on January 26, 1700, river bank Oregon

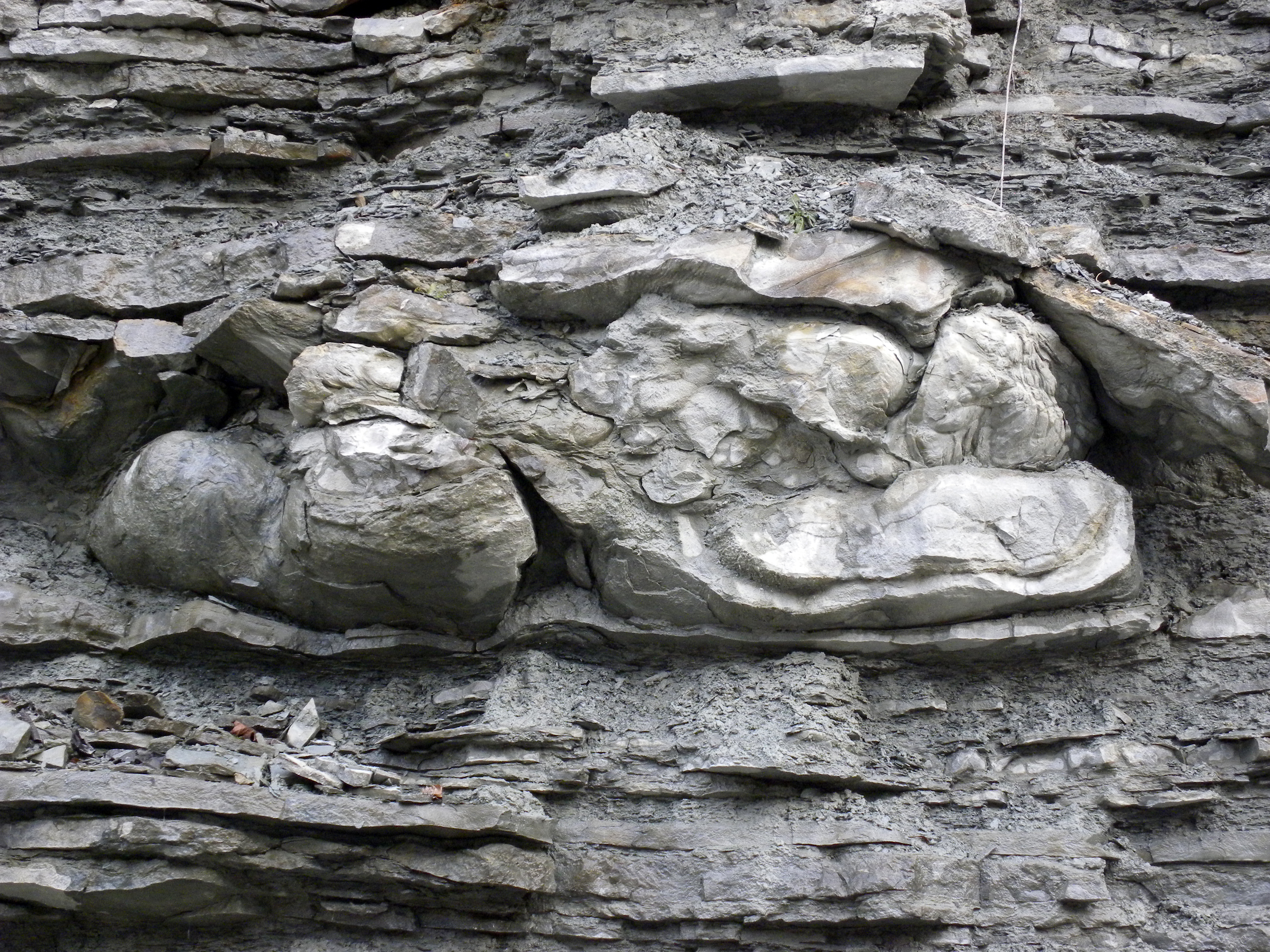
Seismite formed by liquefaction of sediments during a Late Ordovician earthquake (northern Kentucky, USA)

Paleoseismology is the study of ancient earthquakes using geologic evidence, such as geologic sediments and rocks. It is used to supplement seismic monitoring to calculate seismic hazard. Paleoseismology is usually restricted to geologic regimes that have undergone continuous sediment creation for the last few thousand years, such as swamps, lakes, river beds and shorelines.

== Methodology ==
=== Procedure ===
Paleoseismology studies start with finding an active fault. The definition of an active fault can vary, but it is usually based on having tectonically deformed quaternary-age materials that can potentially cause earthquakes. Satellite imaging with high resolution is often used to find such faults, but because of its resolution limitations, there are also other methods such as ground-penetrating radar (GPR), aeromagnetic surveys, and seismic reflection surveys. Faults can be dated in absolute terms using radiocarbon dating.

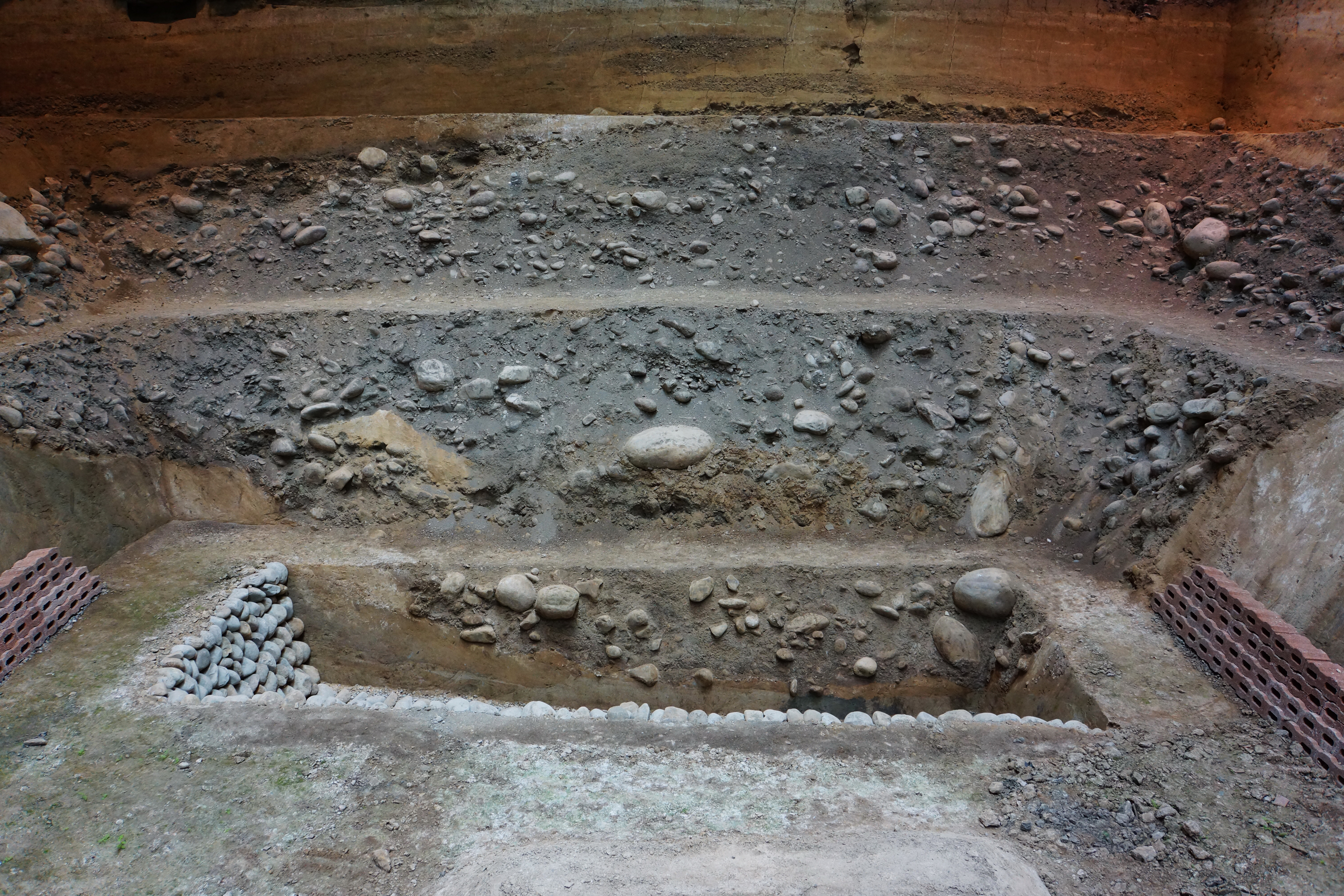
Trenching is done across or parallel to a fault zone. It can help determine properties of paleoearthquakes such as time.

=== Paleoseismic evidence ===
Evidence of paleoearthquakes is classified into three levels: primary or secondary, location, and timing. For level 1, primary evidence is tectonic deformation, while secondary evidence is effects of this such as sediment deposition and elevation changes. However, distinguishing these is not always clear. Level 2 is the location, which is on or off fault. Level 3 is timing, which is either instantaneous (coseismic, or the same time as the earthquake) or delayed (postseismic, or after the earthquake). Types of evidence to identify paleoearthquakes were usually first identified as evidence after historical earthquakes.

Paleoseismic investigations are commonly performed through trenching studies. A trench is dug, and geologists record the attributes of the rock layers. On-fault evidence includes warping and disconformity, angular unconformity, fracturing, fissures, and colluvial wedges. Off-fault evidence includes liquefaction of sand, tsunami deposits, turbidite, and marine terrace uplift.

== Studies and findings ==
Using paleoseismology, it is now known that a few large earthquakes can be responsible for nearly all of the movement on a fault. All seismic events with a moment magnitude of over 8 leave some trace in the sedimentation record.

Another example involves the megathrust earthquakes of the Pacific Northwest. It was thought that seismic hazard in the region was low because relatively few modern earthquakes have been recorded. However, paleoseismology studies showed evidence of extremely large earthquakes (the most recent being in 1700), along with historical tsunami records. In effect, paleoseismology found that the subduction zone under British Columbia, Washington, Oregon, and far northern California, is hazardous in the long term and can generating coastal tsunamis of several hundred feet in height at the coast. Periodically, a slip will occur, which causes the coastal portion to reduce in elevation and thrust toward the west, leading to tsunamis in the central and eastern north Pacific Ocean (with several hours of warning) and a reflux of water toward the coastal shore.

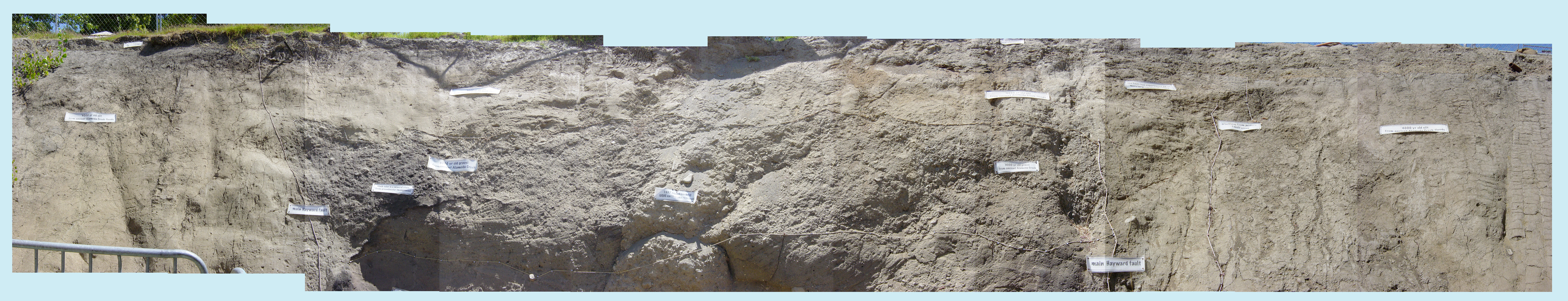
Multiple image view from the platform. The fault has been marked with cordage and various features labeled.

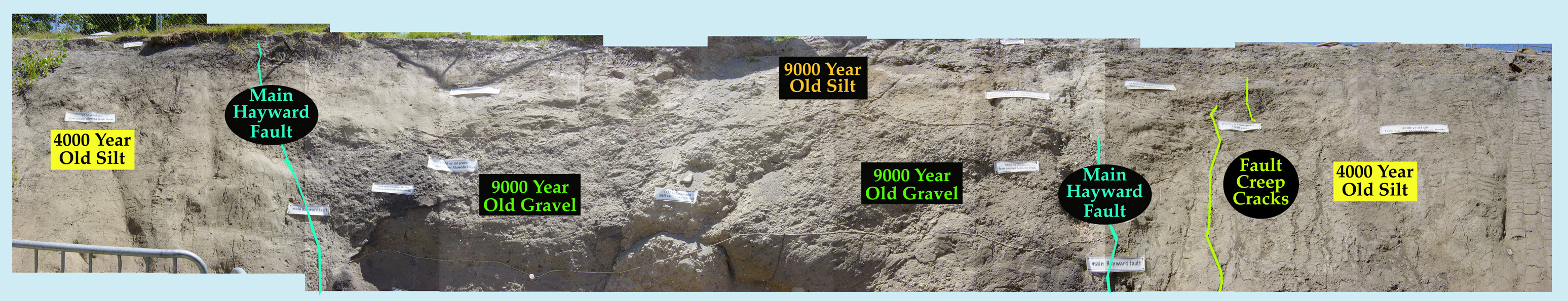
Image with enhanced annotation

== See also ==
- Archaeoseismology
- Earthquake
- Earthquake magnitude
- Fault
- Historical earthquakes
- Paleotempestology
- Paleotsunami
- Seismite
- Seismology
- Tectonics
- Tsunami
- Unconformity

== Sources ==
- James P. McCalpin (2009) Paleoseismology (2nd Edition), Academic Press, ISBN 0-12-373576-9, ISBN 978-0-12-373576-8
- James P. McCalpin (1996) Paleoseismology, Elsevier, ISBN 0-12-481826-9
