= List of rock formations in Monument Valley =

Monument Valley is a region on the Colorado Plateau characterized by a collection of sandstone buttes, mesas, and spires, some rising thousands of feet above the valley floor. Situated along the Arizona–Utah state line within the Navajo Nation, the valley holds significant cultural and spiritual importance for the Navajo people. The following is a list of notable and recognizable rock formations in the area.

== Summits ==
The Monument Valley area has dozens of summits, which are mostly buttes, mesas, and spires.

Name	Image	Coordinates	Elevation	Prominence	Isolation	References
West Mitten Butte		36.990°N 110.095°W	6176 ft (1882 m)	856 ft (260 m)	2.15 mi (3.45 km)	
East Mitten Butte		36.988°N 110.069°W	6226 ft (1898 m)	1026 ft (313 m)	0.91 mi (1.46 km)	
Merrick Butte		36.980°N 110.085°W	6206 ft (1892 m)	966 ft (295 m)	1.07 m (1.72 km)	
Hunts Mesa		36.892°N 110.081°W	6370 ft (1942 m)	250 ft (77 m)	1.16 mi (1.86 km)	
Eagle Mesa		37.047°N 110.121°W	6595 ft (2010 m)	893 ft (272 m)	2.04 mi (3.28 km)	
Sentinel Mesa		37.012°N 110.105°W	6463 ft (1970 m)	903 ft (275 m)	2.5 mi (4.02 km)	
Brighams Tomb		37.046°N 110.084°W	6729 ft (2051 m)	1209 ft (369 m)	17 mi (27.36 km)	
Castle Rock		37.031°N 110.074°W	6534 ft (1992 m)	719 ft (220 m)	1.13 mi (1.83 km)	
Bear and Rabbit		37.033°N 110.073°W	6417 ft (1956 m)	457 ft (139 m)	0.21 mi (0.33 km)	
Stagecoach		37.036°N 110.072°W	6482 ft (1976 m)	543 ft (166 m)	0.69 (1.11 km)	
Big Indian		37.031°N 110.074°W	6373 ft (1942 m)	855 ft (260 m)	0.9 mi (1.45 km)	
Rain God Mesa		36.942°N 110.074°W	5921 ft (1805 m)	601 ft (183 m)	1.46 mi (2.36 km)	
Spearhead Mesa		36.957°N 110.047°W	5998 ft (1828 m)	No data	2.48 mi (3.99 km)	
Mitchell Mesa		36.971°N 110.109°W	6586 ft (2007 m)	666 ft (203 m)	5.26 mi (8.46 km)	
Mitchell Butte		36.976°N 110.152°W	6383 ft (1946 m)	883 ft (270 m)	1.54 mi (2.48 km)	
Three Sisters		36.950°N 110.152°W	North Sister: 6210 ft (1893 m) Middle Sister: 6100 ft (1859 m) South Sister: 6269 ft (1911 m)	North Sister: 370 ft (113 m) Middle Sister: 260 ft (79 m) South Sister: 429 ft (131 m)	North Sister: 0.12 mi (0.19 km) Middle Sister: 0.14 mi (0.23 km) South Sister: 1.67 mi (2.69 km)	
Gray Whiskers		36.968°N 110.137°W	6385 ft (1946 m)	715 ft (218 m)	1.53 mi (2.46 km)	
Elephant Butte		36.971°N 110.109°W	5981 ft (1823 m)	681 ft (208 m)	1.42 mi (2.29 km)	
Camel Butte		36.953°N 110.078°W	5847 ft (1782 m)	507 ft (155 m)	0.5 mi (0.8 km)	
Cly Butte		36.954°N 110.068°W	5820 ft (1774 m)	520 ft (185 m)	0.49 mi (0.79 km)	
King-on-his-Throne		36.971°N 110.109°W	6419 ft (1957 m)	145 ft (45 m)	0.43 mi (0.69 km)	
Rooster Rock		36.915°N 109.985°W	5924 ft (1806 m)	504 ft (154 m)	1.06 mi (1.71 km)	
Setting Hen		37.052°N 110.111°W	6461 ft (1969 m)	573 ft (174 m)	0.29 mi (0.46 km)	
Totem Pole		36.928°N 110.047°W	5621 ft (1713 m)	381 ft (116 m)	0.57 mi (0.92 km)	

== Other formations ==
Monument valley is also home to numerous other non-summit rock formations.

Name	Image	Coordinates	References
Eye of the Sun		36.915°N 110.082°W	
Mystery Valley		36.910°N 110.185°W	
