= Monument Valley =

Region of the Colorado Plateau, US

- Tsé Biiʼ Ndzisgaii
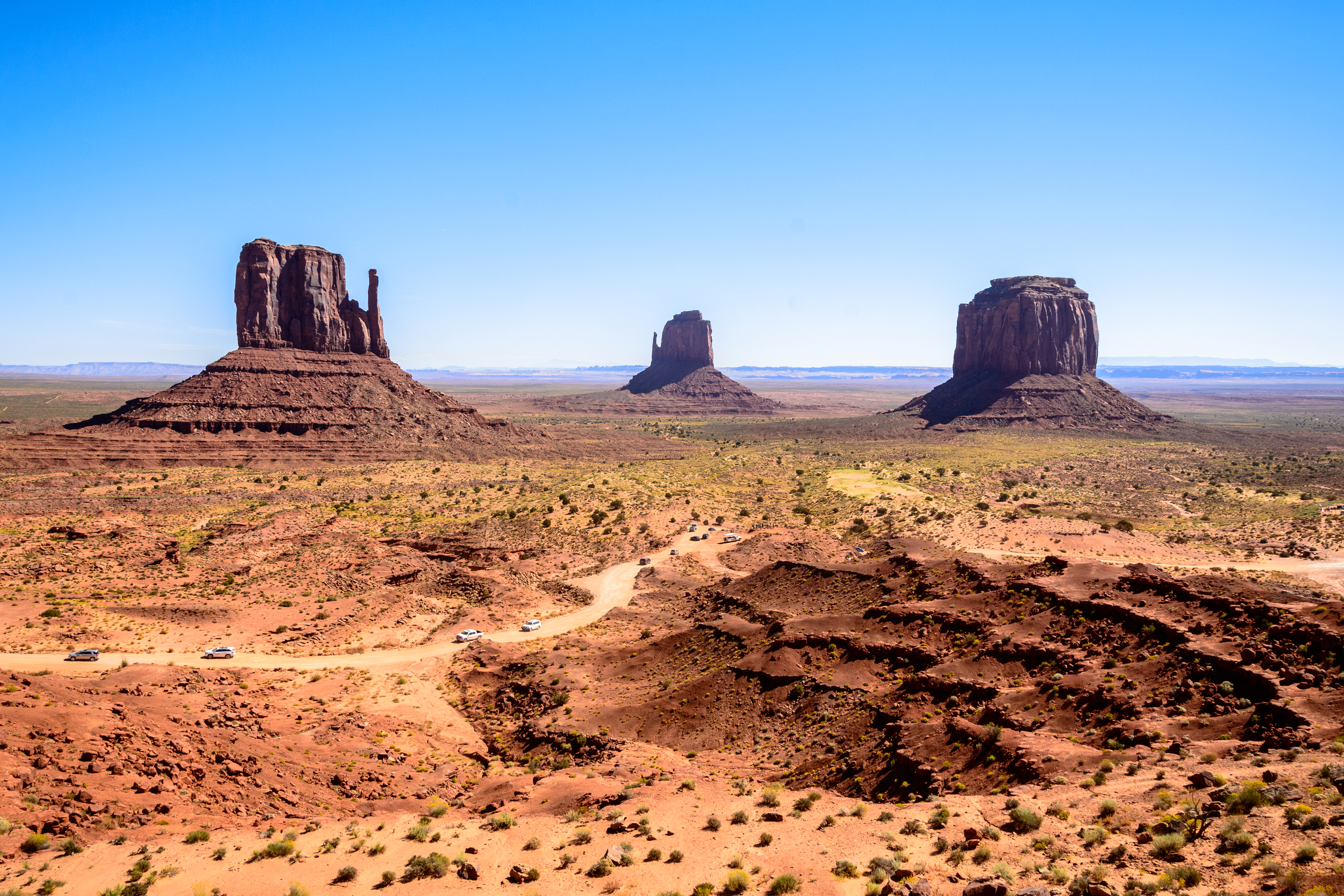
- View of West Mitten Butte, East Mitten Butte, and Merrick Butte in northeastern Arizona

Highest point
- Elevation: 5,000 to 6,000 ft (1,500 to 1,800 m)
- Coordinates: 36°59′N 110°6′W

Naming
- Native name: Tsé Biiʼ Ndzisgaii (Navajo)

Geography
- Location within Arizona Location within the United States
- Location: Arizona, United States

Geology
- Mountain type: Butte
- Rock type: Siltstone

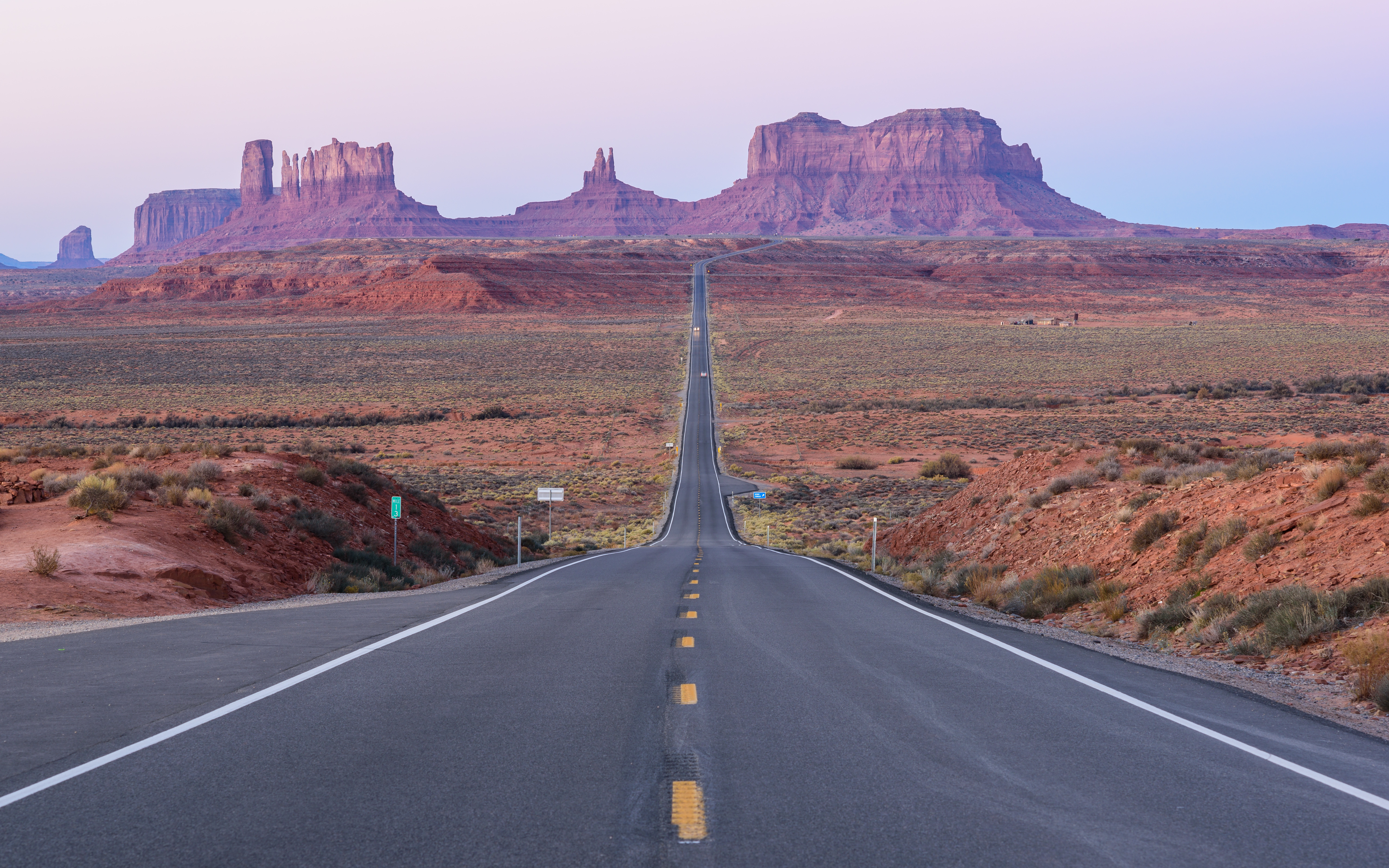
View of Monument Valley in Utah, looking south on U.S. Route 163 from 13 miles (21 km) north of the Utah–Arizona state line. American filmmaker Robert Zemeckis used this exact shot in his 1994 film Forrest Gump.

Monument Valley (Navajo: Tsé Biiʼ Ndzisgaii, pronounced [tsʰépìːʔ ǹtsɪ̀skɑ̀ìː], meaning "valley of the rocks") is a region of the Colorado Plateau characterized by a cluster of sandstone buttes, with the largest reaching 1,000 ft (300 m) above the valley floor. The most famous butte formations are located in northeastern Arizona along the Utah–Arizona state line. The valley is considered sacred by the Navajo Nation, the Native American people within whose reservation it lies.

Monument Valley has been featured in many forms of media since the 1930s. Famed director John Ford used the location for a number of his Westerns. Film critic Keith Phipps wrote that "its five square miles [13 km^{2}] have defined what decades of moviegoers think of when they imagine the American West".

== Geography and geology ==
Monument Valley is part of the Colorado Plateau. The elevation of the valley floor ranges from 5,000 to 6,000 feet (1,500 to 1,800 m) above sea level. The floor is largely siltstone of the Cutler Group, or sand derived from it, deposited by the meandering rivers that carved the valley. The valley's vivid red coloration comes from iron oxide exposed in the weathered siltstone. The darker, blue-gray rocks in the valley get their color from manganese oxide.

The buttes arising from the valley floor are clearly stratified, with three principal layers. The lowest layer is the Organ Rock Shale, the middle is de Chelly Sandstone, and the top layer is the Moenkopi Formation capped by Shinarump Conglomerate. Major rock formations include West and East Mitten Buttes, Merrick Butte, Hunts Mesa, Eagle Mesa, Sentinel Mesa, Brighams Tomb, Castle Rock, Stagecoach, Big Indian, Rain God Mesa, Spearhead Mesa, Mitchell Mesa, Mitchell Butte, Gray Whiskers, Elephant Butte, Camel Butte, Cly Butte, King-on-his-Throne, Rooster Rock, and Setting Hen. Another notable formation is Totem Pole, a highly eroded butte remanent. The valley also includes large stone structures, such as the "Eye of the Sun".

Between 1945 and 1967, the southern extent of the Monument Upwarp was mined for uranium, which occurs in scattered areas of the Shinarump Conglomerate; vanadium and copper are associated with uranium in some deposits.

== Tourism ==
Monument Valley includes much of the area surrounding Monument Valley Navajo Tribal Park, a Navajo Nation equivalent to a national park. Oljato, for example, is also within the area designated as Monument Valley.

Visitors may pay an access fee and drive through the park on a 17-mile (27 km) dirt road. Parts of Monument Valley, such as Mystery Valley and Hunts Mesa, are accessible only by guided tour.

== Climate ==
Monument Valley experiences a desert climate with cold winters and hot summers. While the summers may be hot, the heat is tempered by the region's high altitude. Although the valley experiences an average of 54 days above 90 °F (32 °C) annually, summer highs rarely exceed 100 °F (38 °C). Summer nights are comfortably cool, and temperatures drop quickly after sunset. Winters are cold, but daytime highs are usually above freezing. Even in the winter, temperatures below 0 °F (−18 °C) are uncommon, although possible. Monument Valley receives an occasional light snowfall in the winter, but it usually melts within a day or two.

Climate data for Monument Valley, Arizona
Month	Jan	Feb	Mar	Apr	May	Jun	Jul	Aug	Sep	Oct	Nov	Dec	Year
Record high °F (°C)	60 (16)	69 (21)	77 (25)	90 (32)	99 (37)	101 (38)	107 (42)	100 (38)	97 (36)	86 (30)	73 (23)	62 (17)	107 (42)
Mean maximum °F (°C)	52.07 (11.15)	59.41 (15.23)	70.37 (21.32)	80.04 (26.69)	88.27 (31.26)	96.64 (35.91)	99.44 (37.47)	96.13 (35.63)	90.48 (32.49)	80.36 (26.87)	65.18 (18.43)	51.89 (11.05)	100.17 (37.87)
Mean daily maximum °F (°C)	40.6 (4.8)	47.3 (8.5)	58.2 (14.6)	67.3 (19.6)	77.6 (25.3)	88.1 (31.2)	92.0 (33.3)	88.8 (31.6)	80.6 (27.0)	67.9 (19.9)	51.5 (10.8)	40.9 (4.9)	66.7 (19.3)
Mean daily minimum °F (°C)	24.3 (−4.3)	28.2 (−2.1)	35.5 (1.9)	42.4 (5.8)	52.3 (11.3)	63.1 (17.3)	67.0 (19.4)	63.9 (17.7)	57.3 (14.1)	45.1 (7.3)	32.9 (0.5)	24.6 (−4.1)	44.7 (7.1)
Mean minimum °F (°C)	12.25 (−10.97)	15.25 (−9.31)	22.04 (−5.53)	28.69 (−1.84)	35.24 (1.80)	47.08 (8.38)	57.58 (14.21)	54.73 (12.63)	44.72 (7.07)	32.61 (0.34)	18.75 (−7.36)	12.78 (−10.68)	11.50 (−11.39)
Record low °F (°C)	−8 (−22)	−4 (−20)	9 (−13)	15 (−9)	20 (−7)	31 (−1)	49 (9)	38 (3)	33 (1)	22 (−6)	6 (−14)	−9 (−23)	−9 (−23)
Average precipitation inches (mm)	0.26 (6.6)	0.19 (4.8)	0.19 (4.8)	0.24 (6.1)	0.30 (7.6)	0.10 (2.5)	0.54 (14)	0.79 (20)	0.73 (19)	0.68 (17)	0.32 (8.1)	0.19 (4.8)	4.54 (115)
Source: The Western Regional Climate Center

== In visual media ==
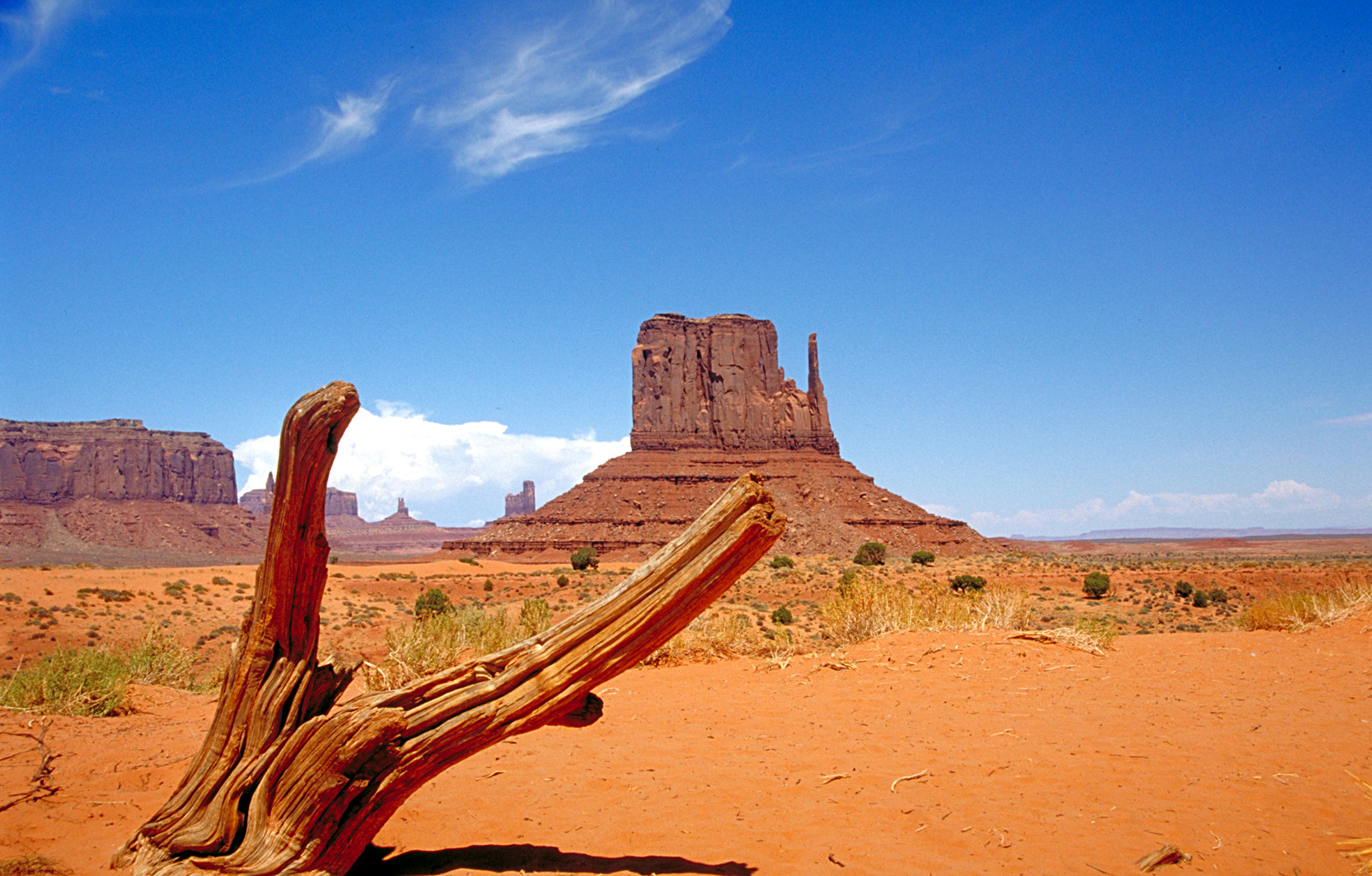
Monument Valley from the valley floor

Monument Valley has been featured in numerous computer games, in print, and in motion pictures, including multiple Westerns directed by John Ford that influenced audiences' view of the American West, such as: Stagecoach (1939), My Darling Clementine (1946), Fort Apache (1948), She Wore a Yellow Ribbon (1949), and The Searchers (1956).

Many more recent movies, with other directors, were also filmed in Monument Valley, including Sergio Leone's Once Upon a Time in the West (1968), the first Spaghetti Western to be filmed (in 1967) outside Europe, and Gore Verbinski's The Lone Ranger (2013).

== Gallery ==
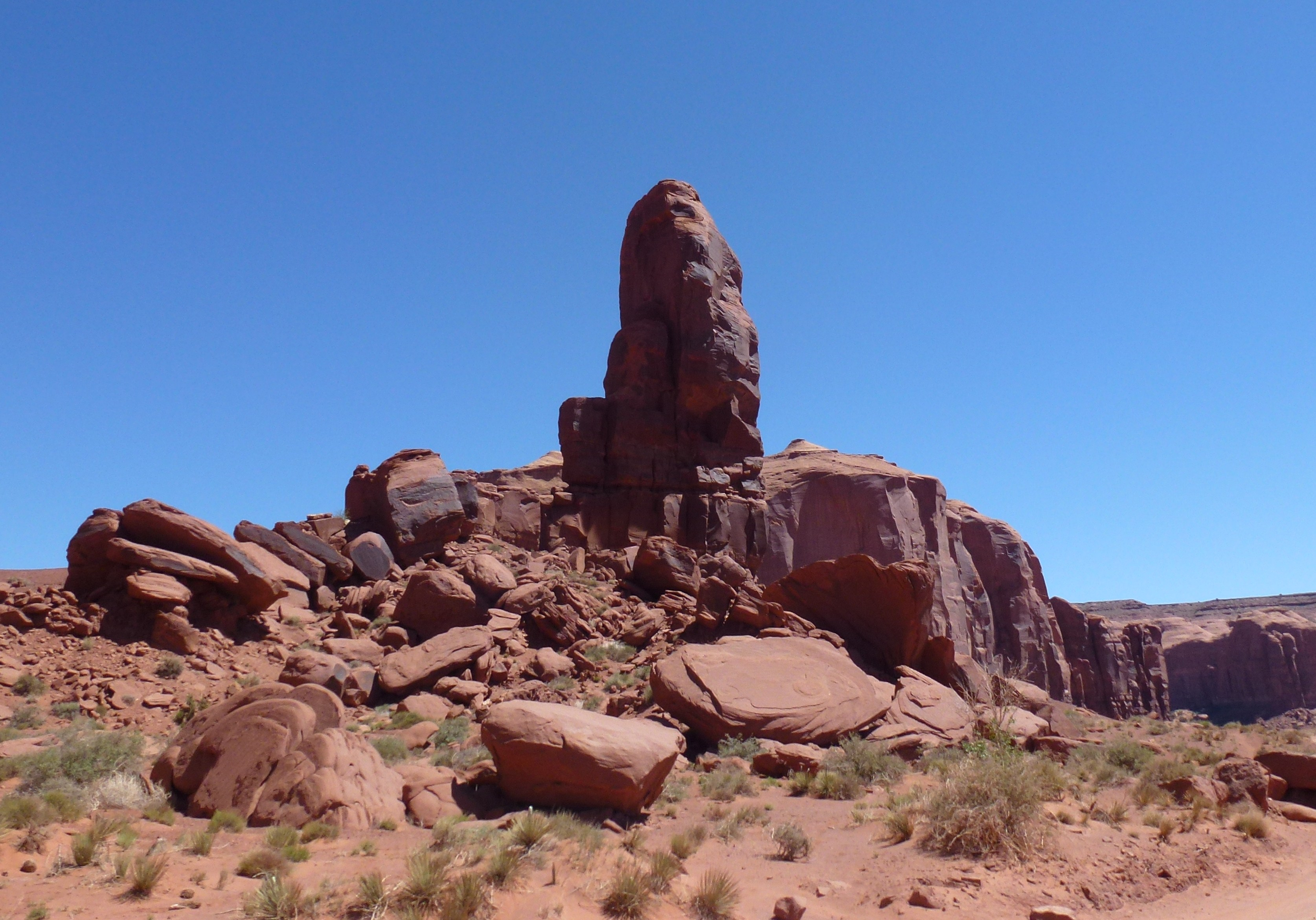
Monument Valley, the Thumb

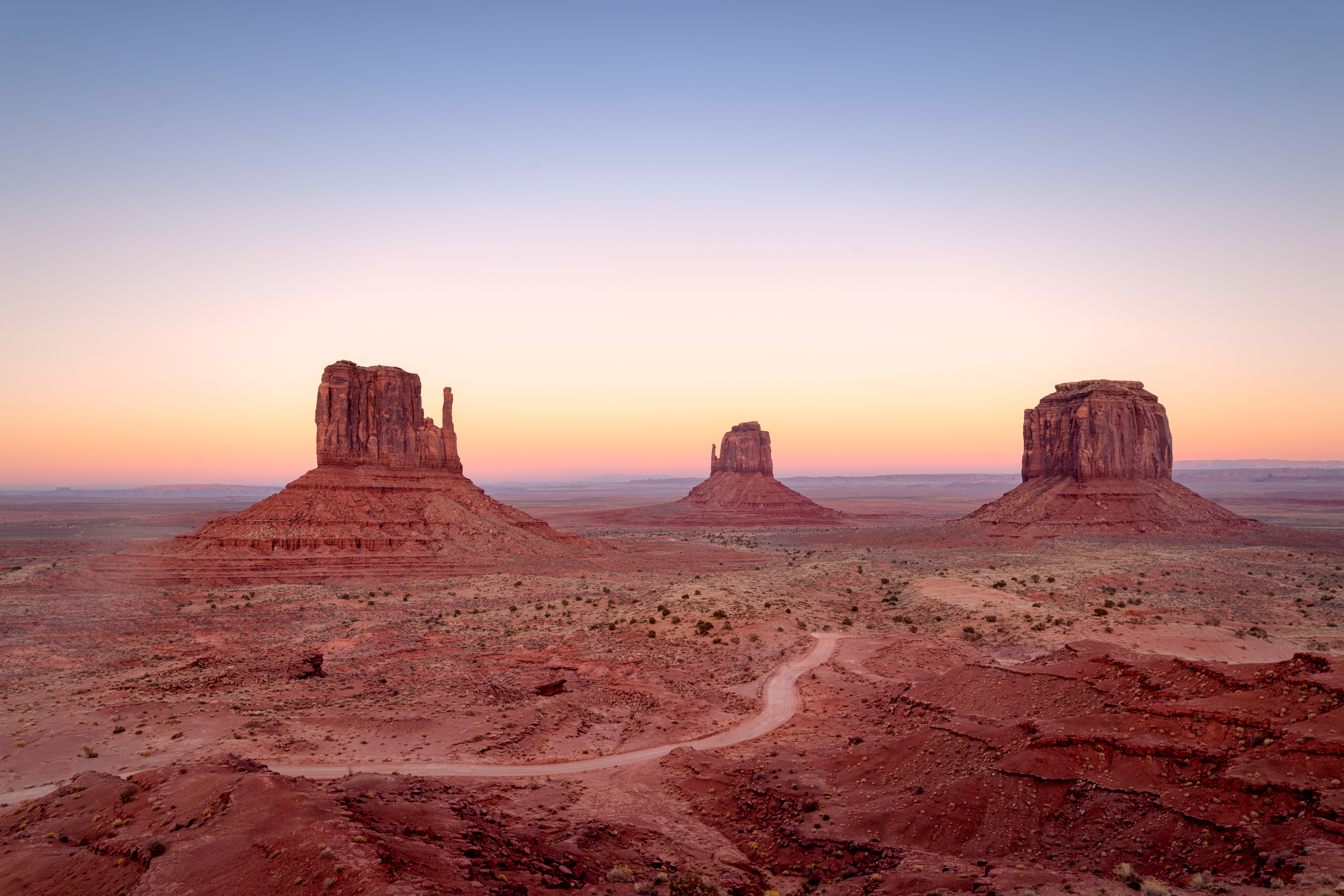
West, East Mittens and Merrick Butte after sunset

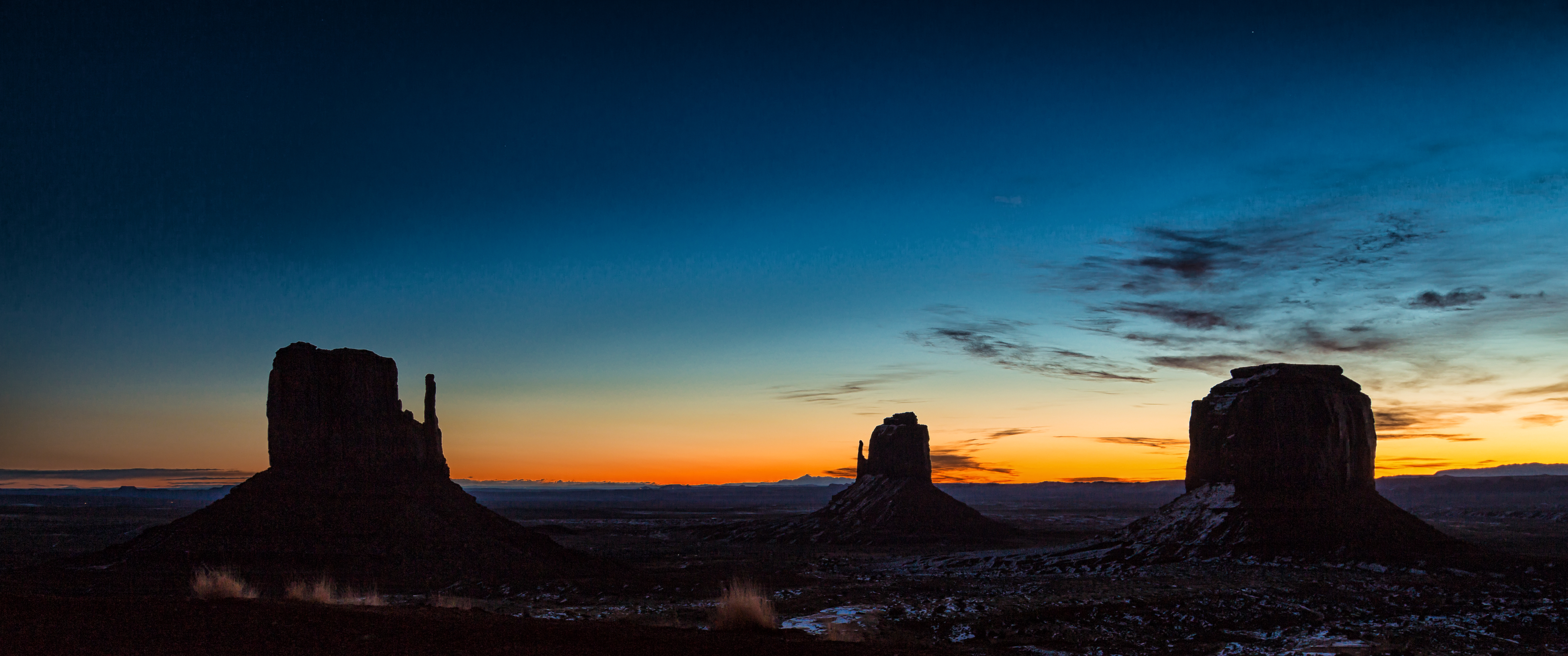
Snow-covered Monument Valley sunrise in January

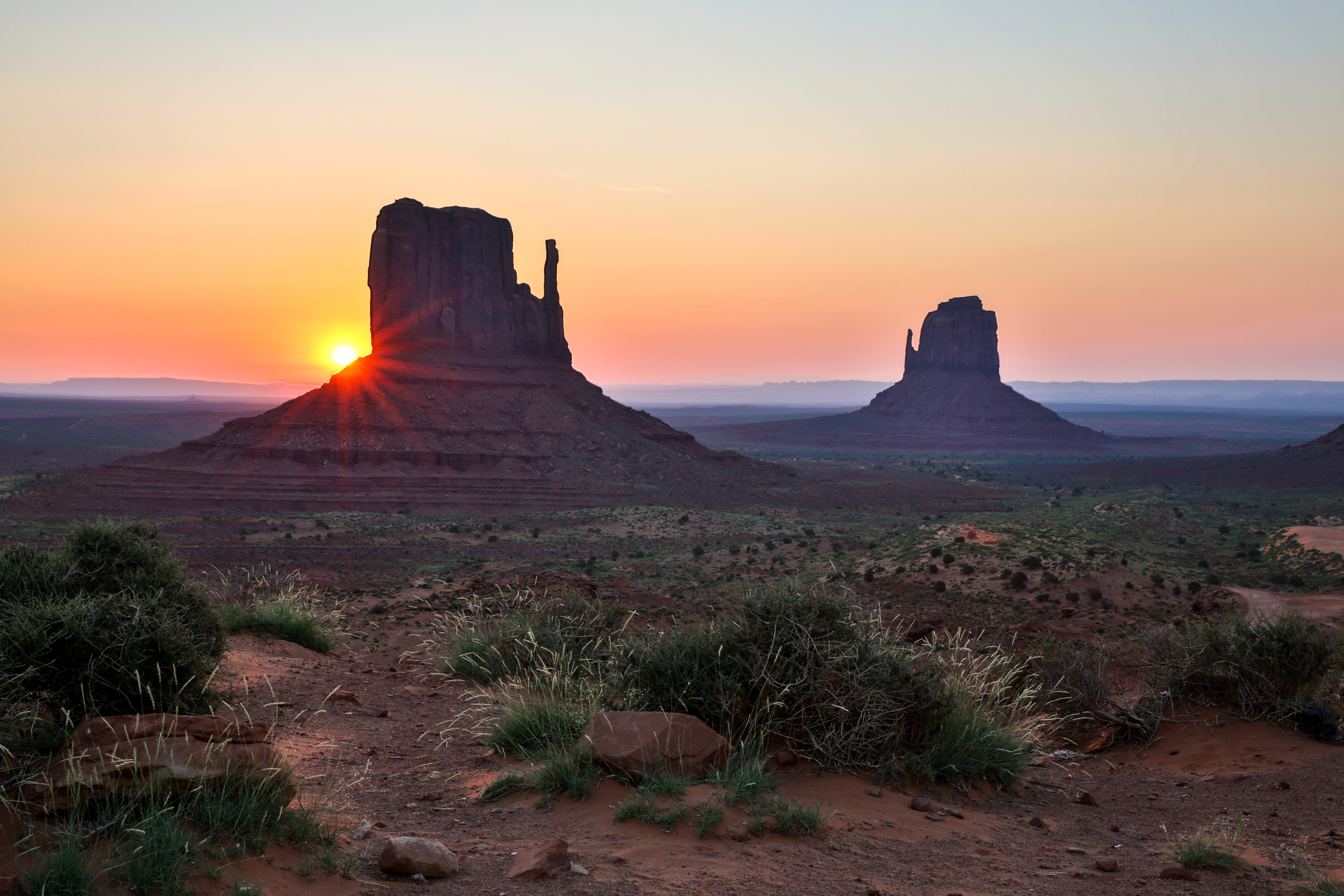
Monument Valley West and East Butte at 6:00 am

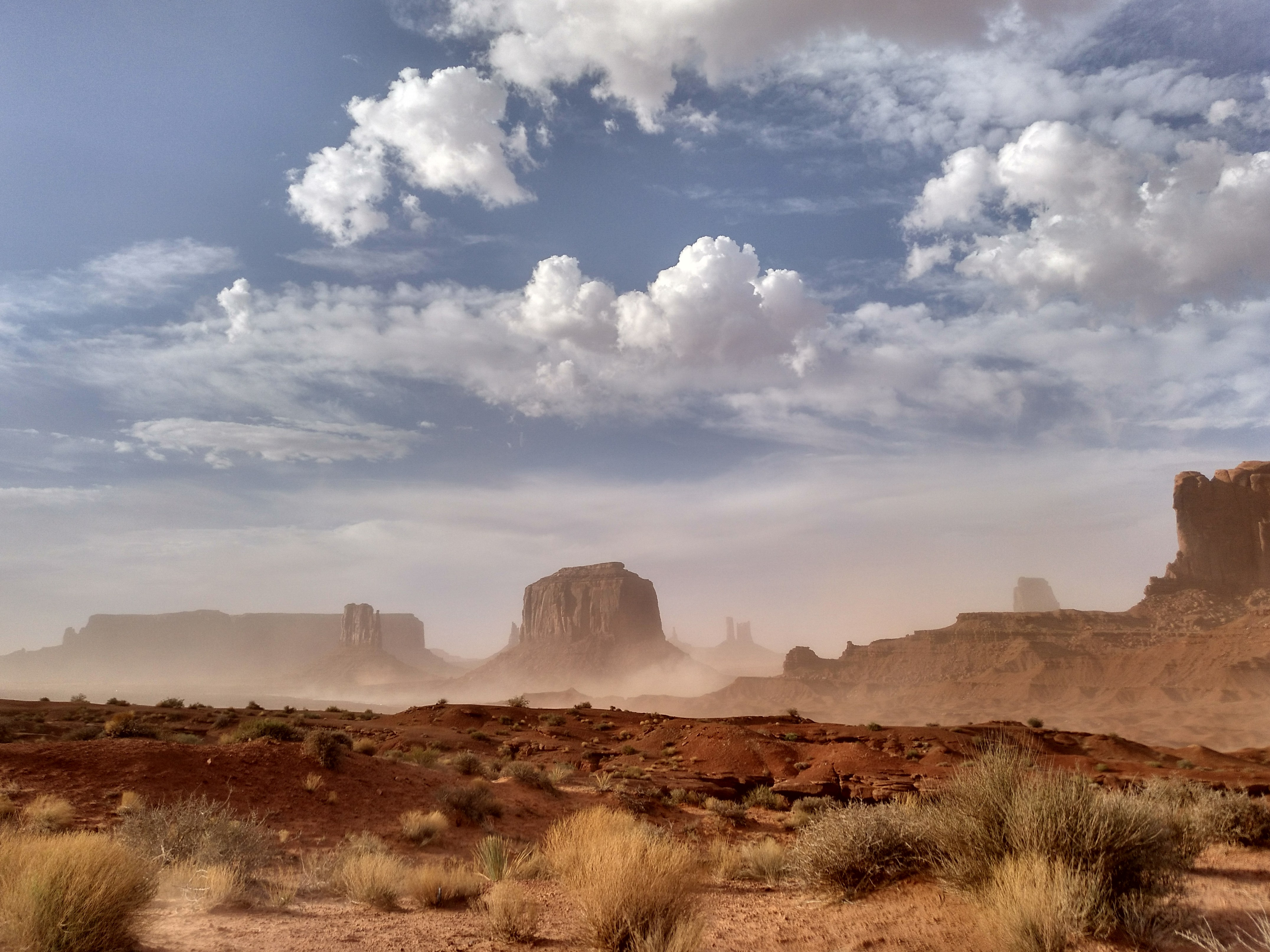
Sandstorm in Monument Valley

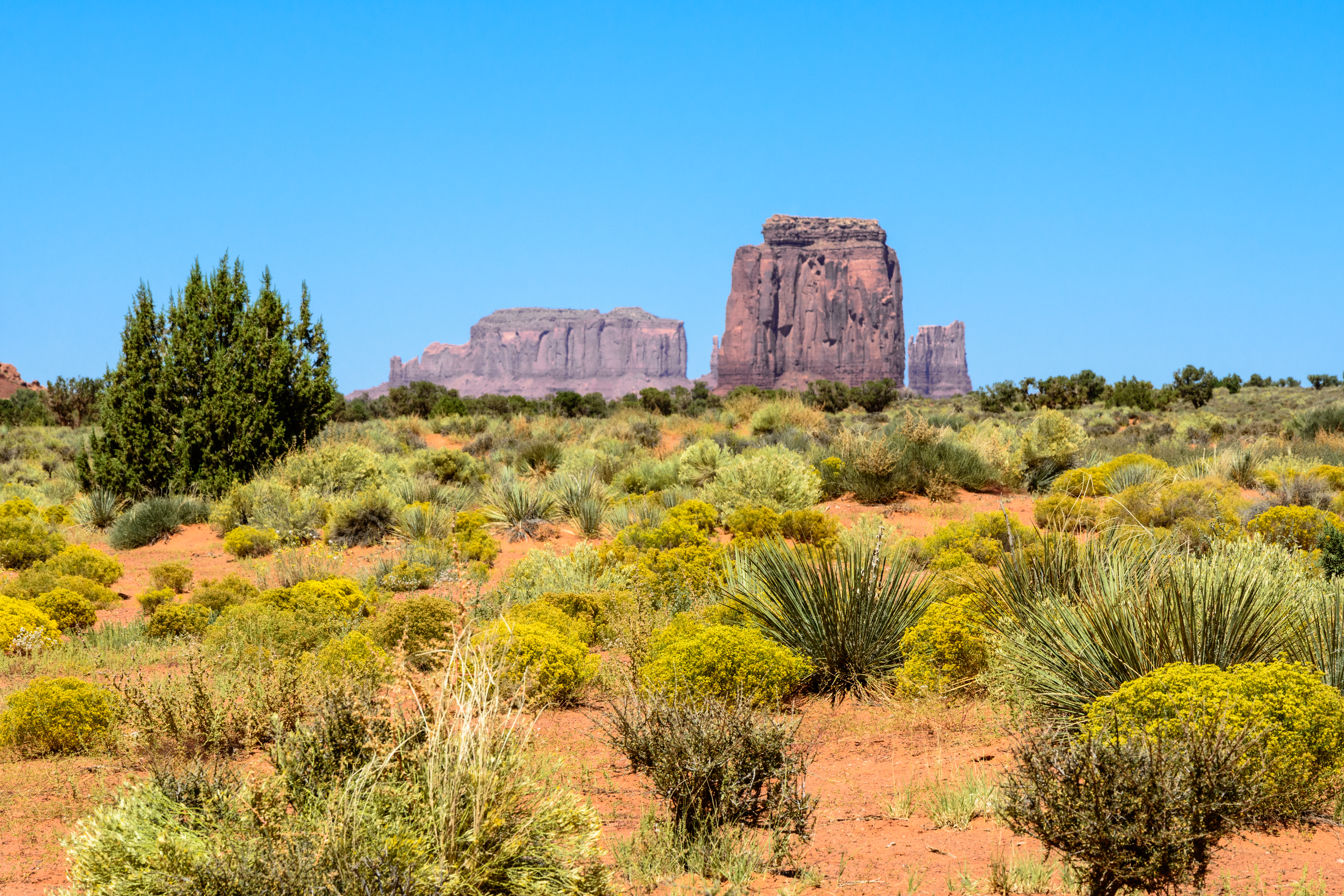
Vegetation of Monument Valley

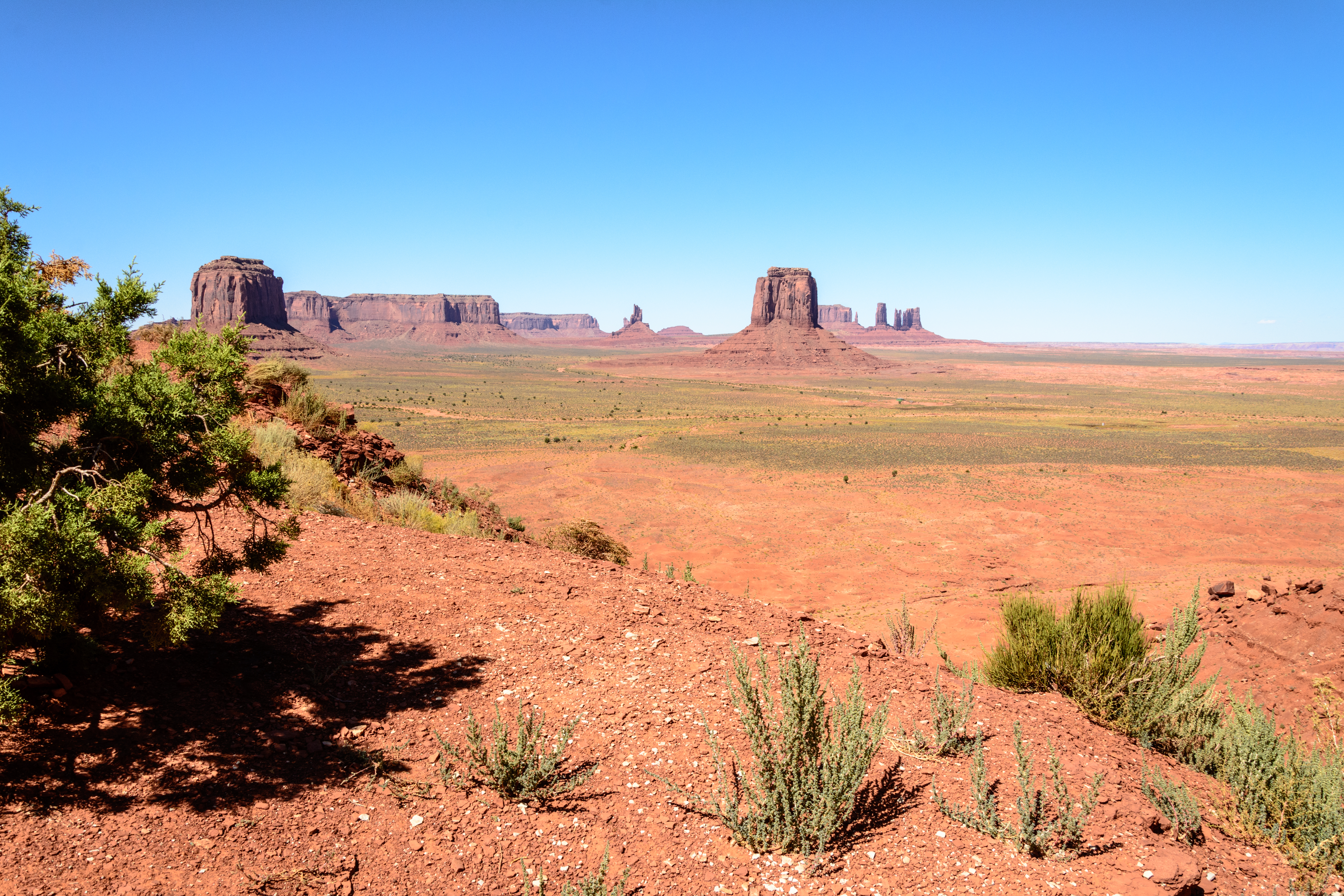
Monument Valley landscape

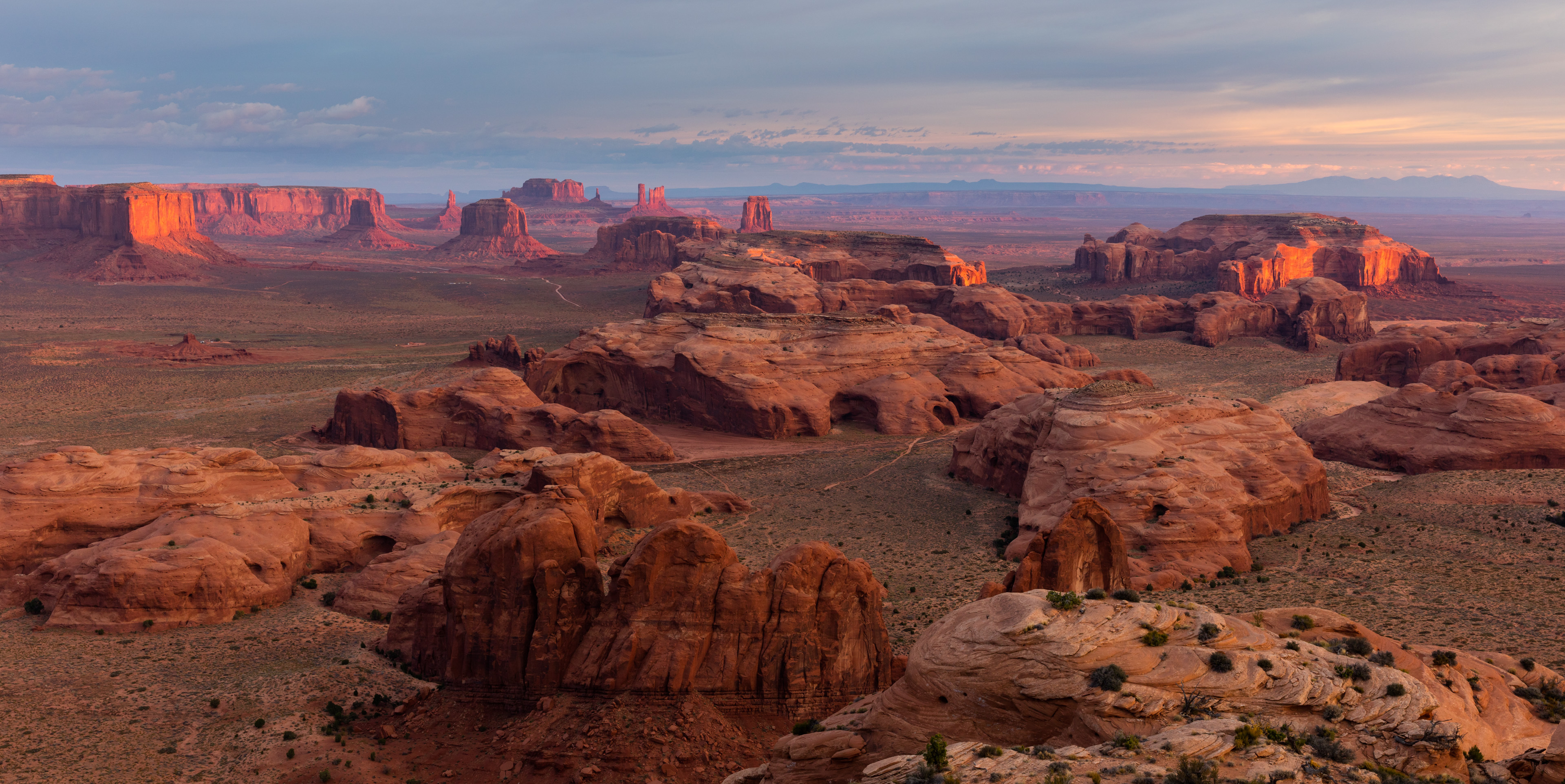
View on the Monument Valley from Hunts mesa

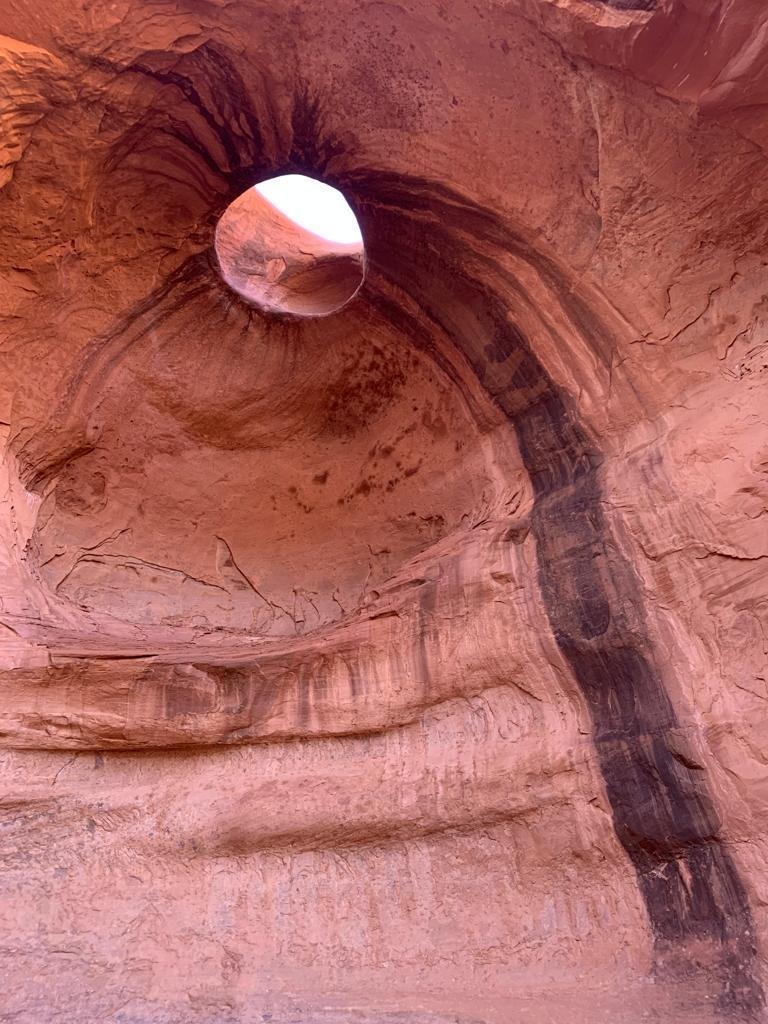
Monument Valley rock formation

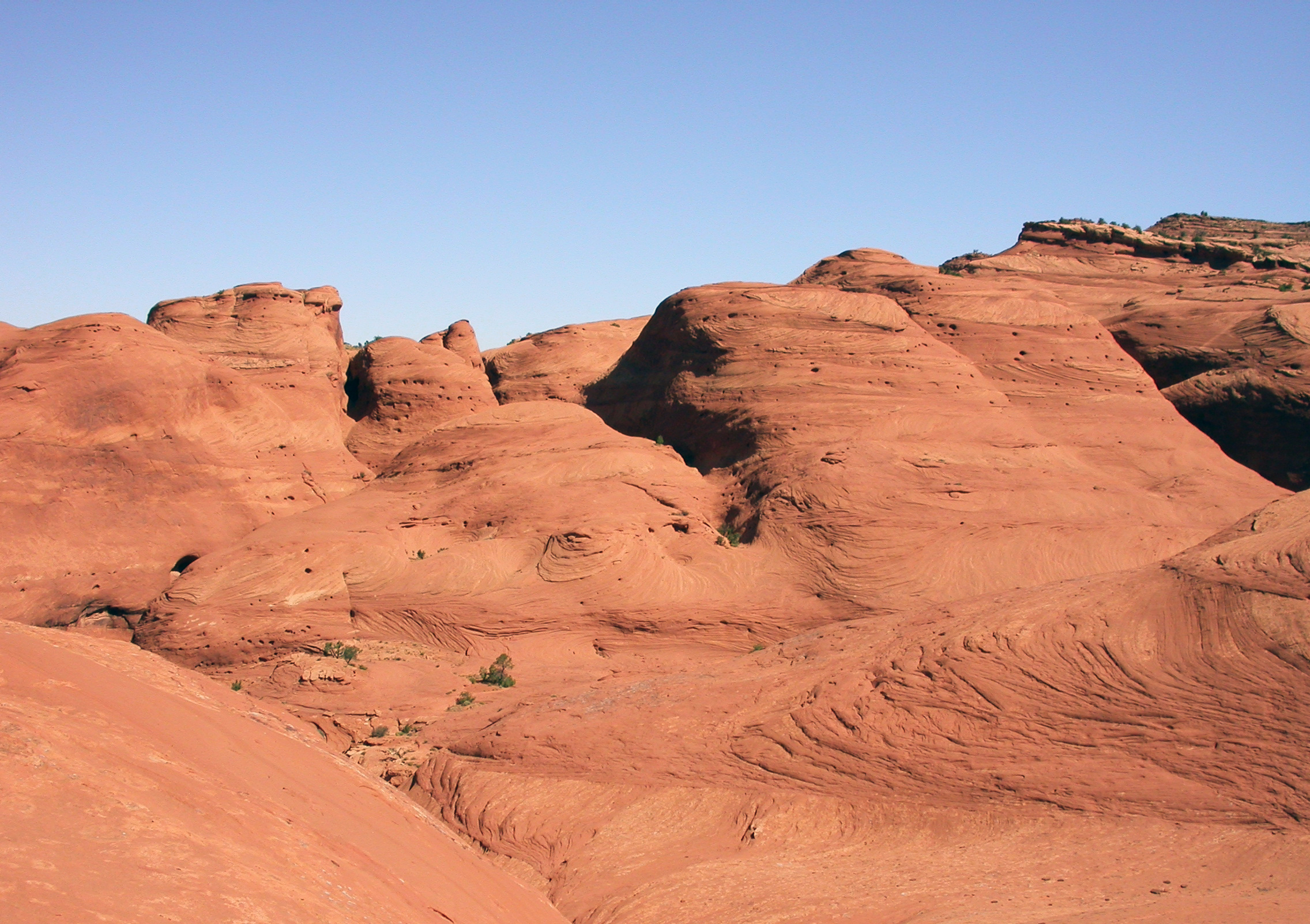
Mystery Valley

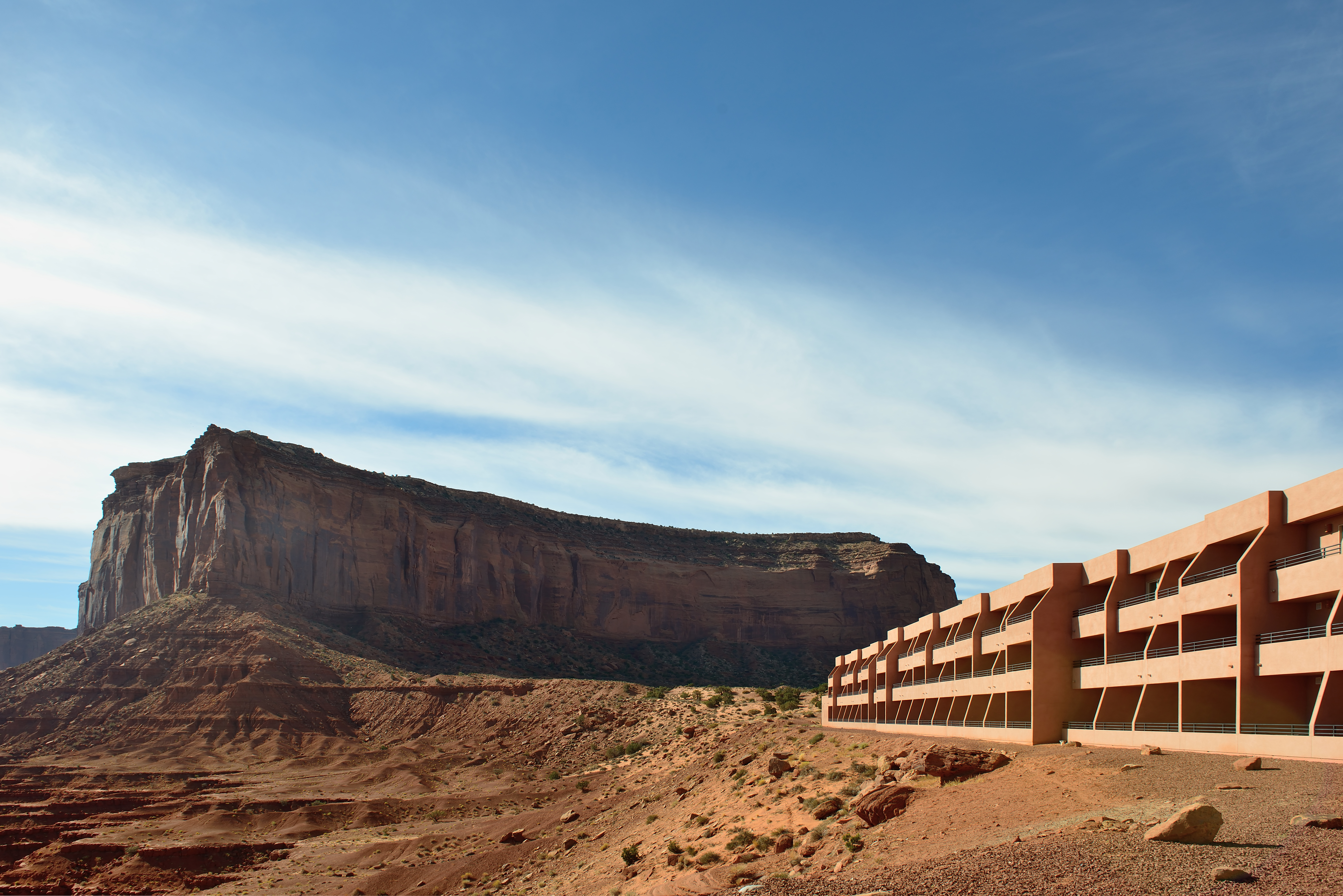
Mitchel Mesa from the View Hotel

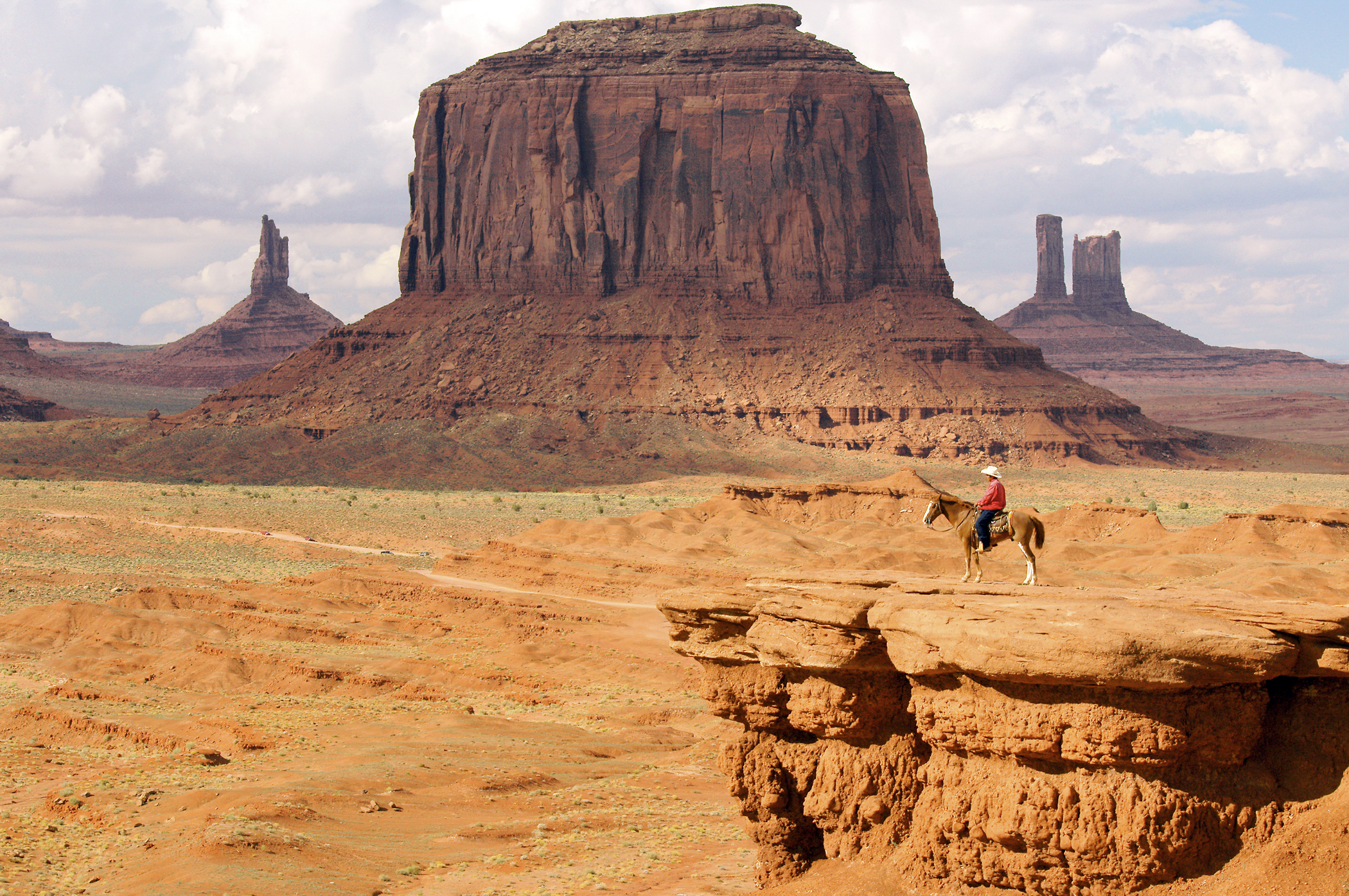
An Apache scout on horseback

=== Panorama ===
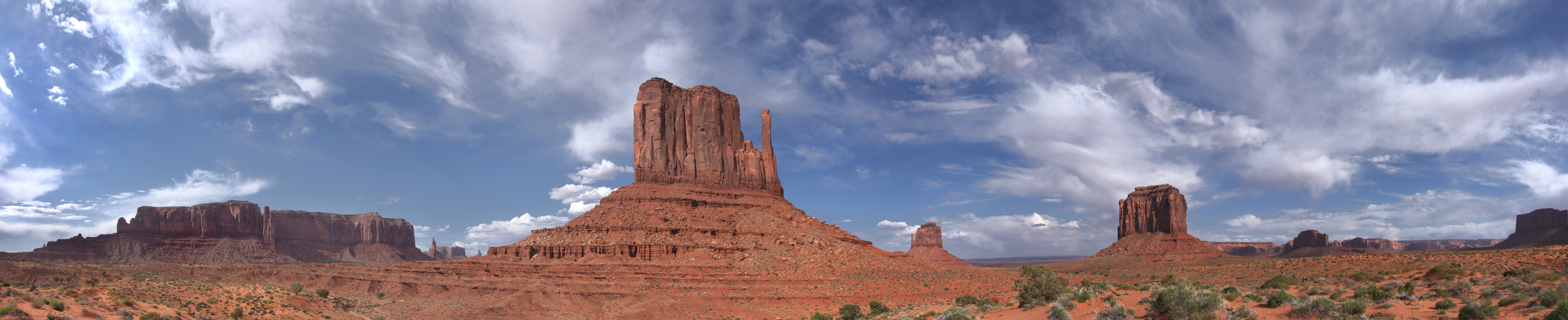
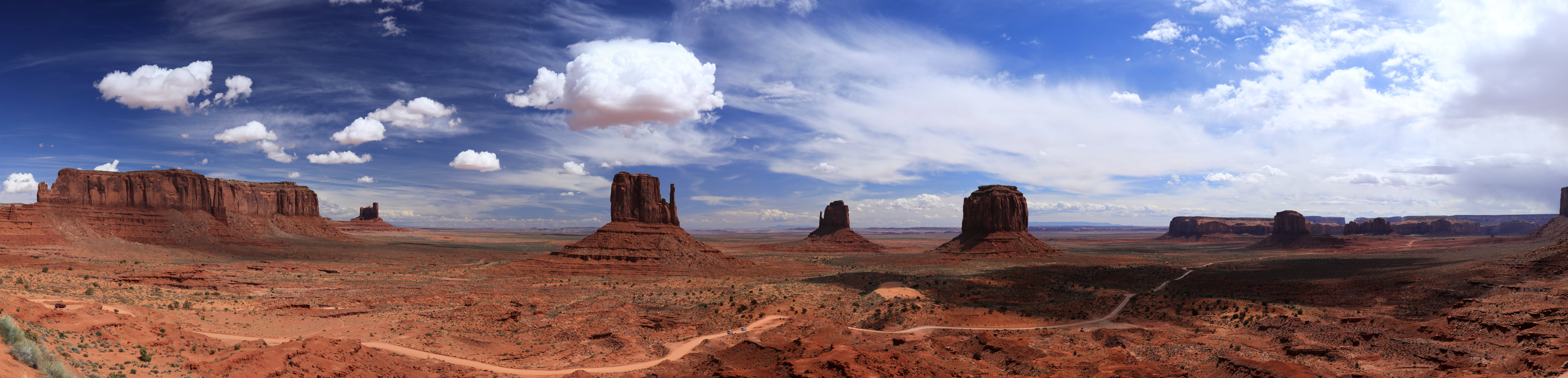

== See also ==
- List of sandstones
- Valley of the Gods
- Uluru
- Goulding's Lodge
- Tepui
- List of rock formations in Monument Valley
