= Rooster Rock (Arizona) =

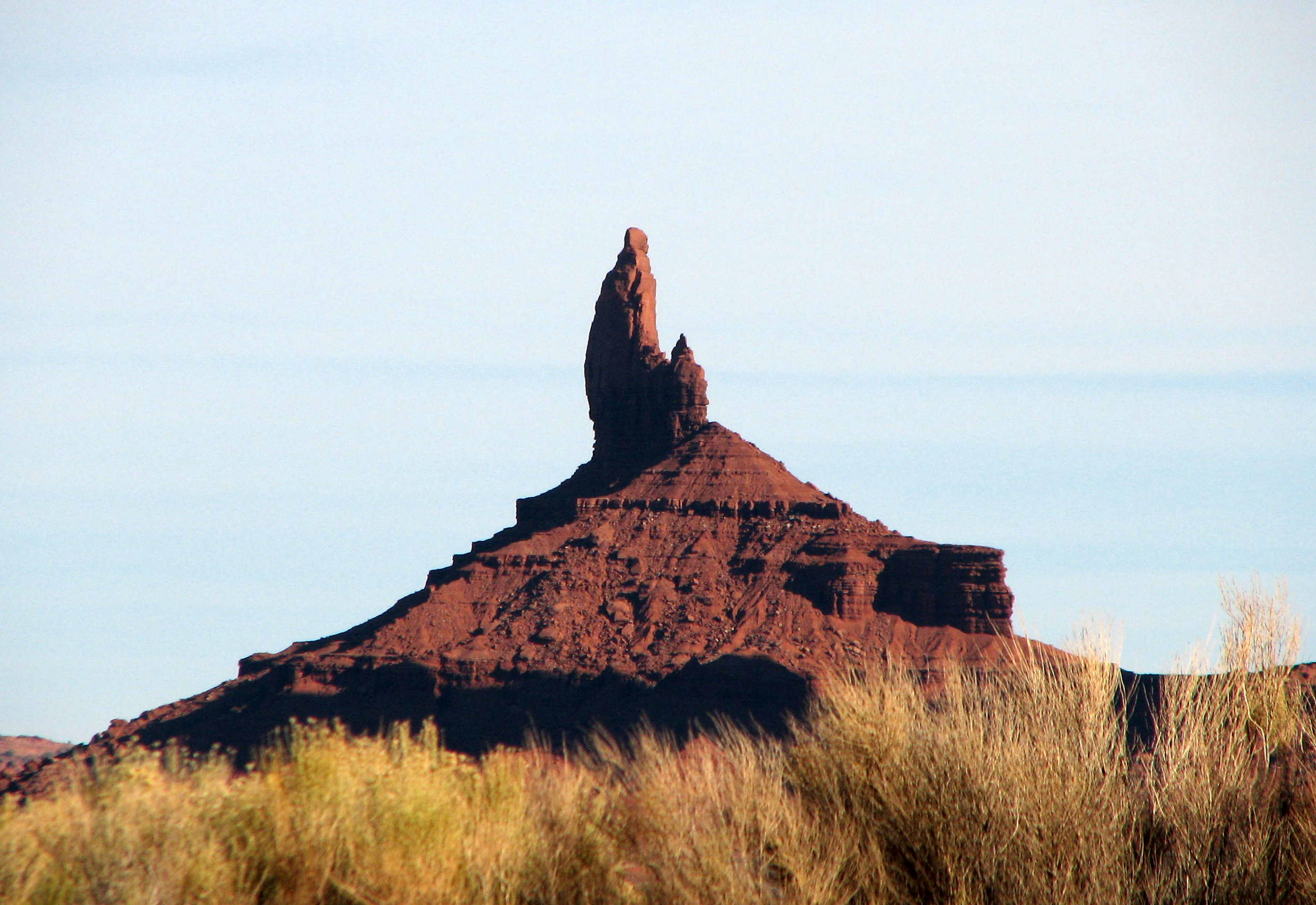
- West aspect

Highest point
- Elevation: 5,985 ft (1,824 m)
- Prominence: 575 ft (175 m)
- Parent peak: Meridian Butte (6,430 ft)
- Isolation: 1.05 mi (1.69 km)
- Coordinates: 36°54′56″N 109°59′08″W

Geography
- Location within Arizona Location within the United States
- Location: Navajo Nation; Apache County, Arizona, U.S.
- Parent range: Colorado Plateau
- Topo map: USGS Rooster Rock

Geology
- Rock age: Permian
- Mountain type: Butte
- Rock type: Sandstone

Rooster Rock is a 5,985-foot-elevation (1,824-meter) summit in Apache County, Arizona, United States.

== Description ==
Rooster Rock is situated 8.25 miles (13.28 km) southeast of the Monument Valley visitor center on Navajo Nation land. Precipitation runoff from this butte's slopes drains into Gypsum Creek, which is a tributary of the San Juan River. Topographic relief is significant, as the summit rises nearly 900 feet (274 meters) above the surrounding terrain in 0.25 mile (0.4 km). The nearest higher neighbor is Meridian Butte, 1.06 miles (1.71 km) to the south-southwest. The landform's descriptive toponym has been officially adopted by the U.S. Board on Geographic Names.

== Geology ==
Rooster Rock is a butte composed of two principal strata. The bottom layer is slope-forming Organ Rock Shale and the upper stratum is cliff-forming De Chelly Sandstone. The rock was deposited during the Permian period. The buttes and mesas of Monument Valley are the result of the Organ Rock Shale being more easily eroded than the overlaying sandstone.

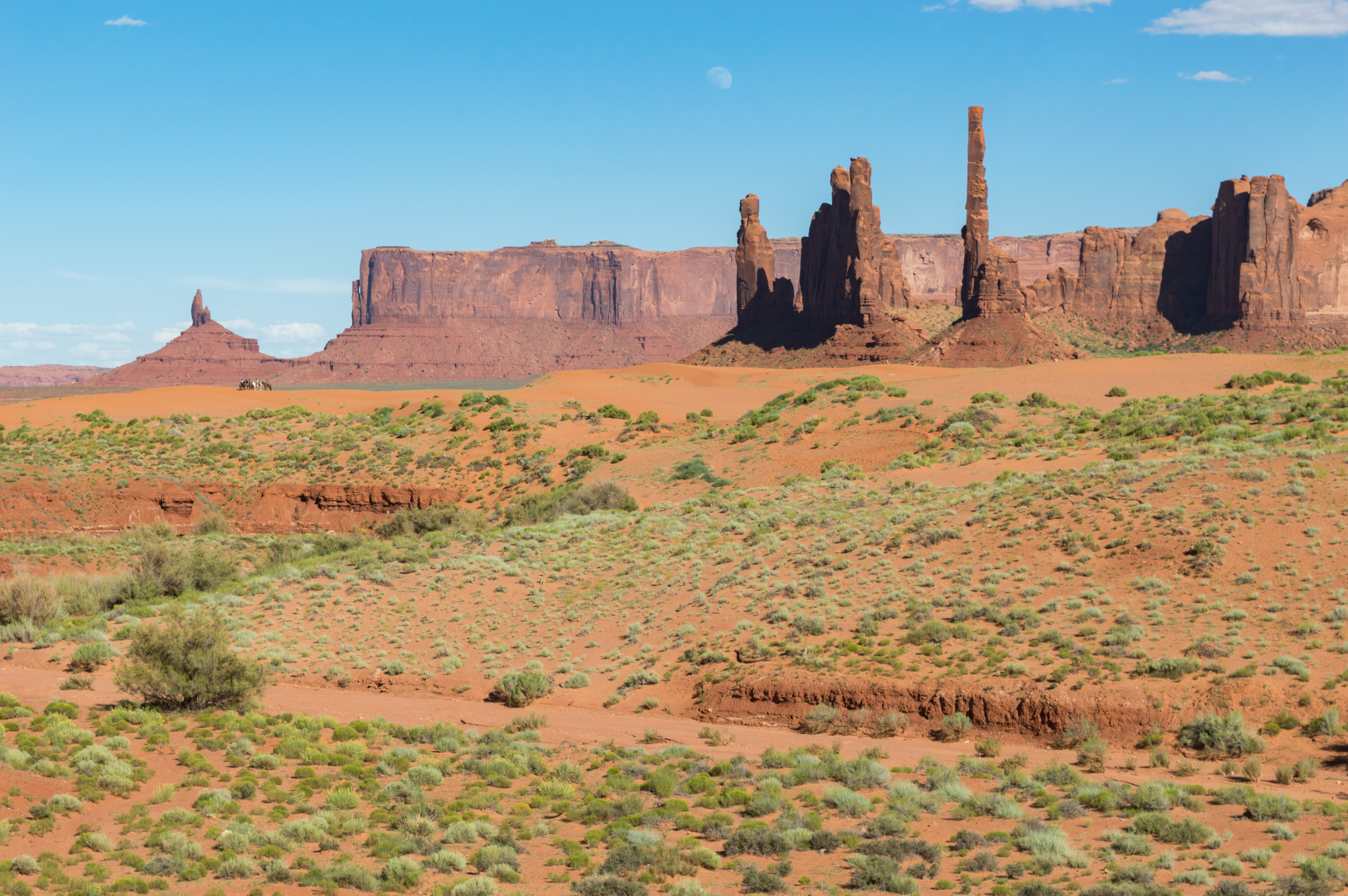
Rooster Rock (distant left), Totem Pole (right)

== Climate ==
Spring and fall are the most favorable seasons to visit Rooster Rock. According to the Köppen climate classification system, it is located in a semi-arid climate zone with cold winters and hot summers. Summers average 54 days above 90 °F (32 °C) annually, and highs rarely exceed 100 °F (38 °C). Summer nights are comfortably cool, and temperatures drop quickly after sunset. Winters are cold, but daytime highs are usually above freezing. Winter temperatures below 0 °F (−18 °C) are uncommon, though possible. This desert climate receives less than 10 inches (250 millimeters) of annual rainfall, and snowfall is generally light during the winter.

== See also ==
- List of appearances of Monument Valley in the media
