= Rain God Mesa =

Mesa in Navajo County, Arizona, United States

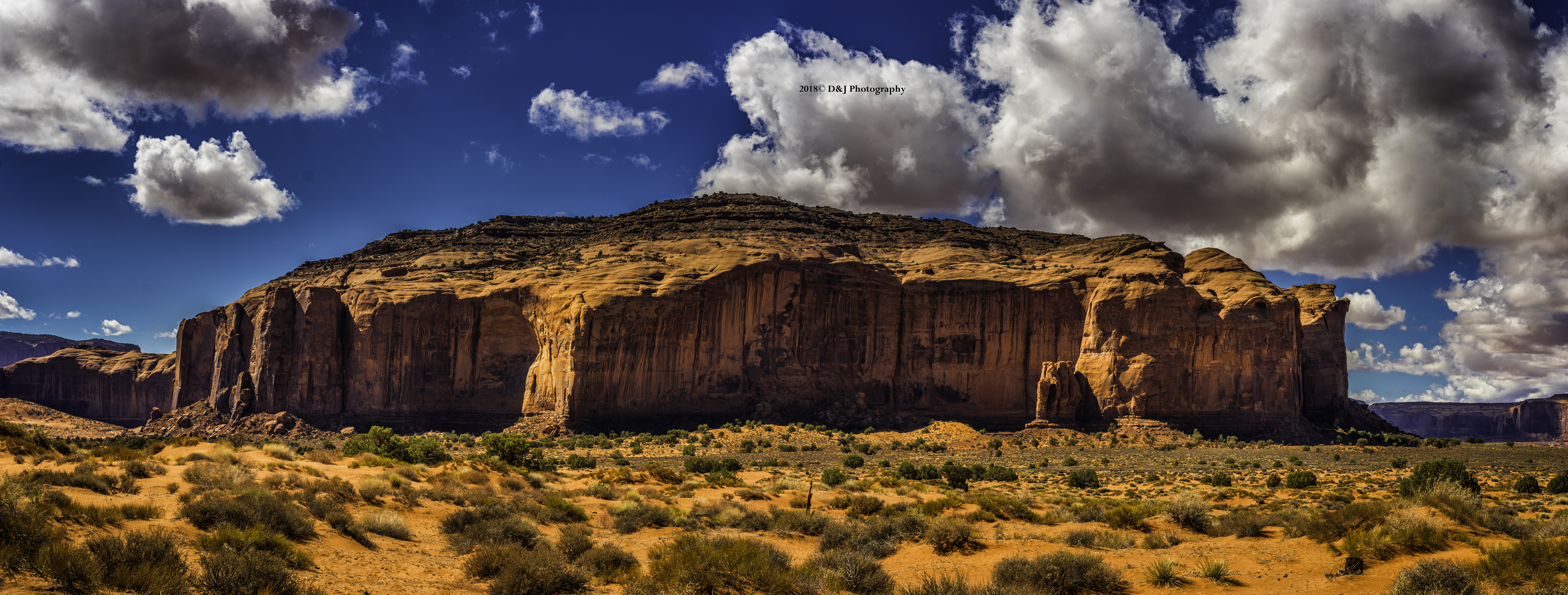
- Northeast aspect

Highest point
- Elevation: 5,921 ft (1,805 m)
- Prominence: 621 ft (189 m)
- Parent peak: Mitchell Mesa (6,586 ft)
- Isolation: 1.22 mi (1.96 km)
- Coordinates: 36°56′32″N 110°04′26″W

Geography
- Location within Arizona Location within the United States
- Location: Navajo Nation; Navajo County, Arizona, U.S.
- Parent range: Colorado Plateau
- Topo map: USGS Mitten Buttes

Geology
- Mountain type: Mesa
- Rock type: Sandstone

Rain God Mesa is a 5,921-foot-elevation (1,805-meter) summit in Navajo County, Arizona, United States.

== Description ==
Rain God Mesa is situated 3.5 miles (5.6 km) southeast of the Monument Valley visitor center on Navajo Nation land. Precipitation runoff from this mesa's slopes drains into Gypsum Creek which is a tributary of the San Juan River. Topographic relief is significant as the summit rises 600 feet (183 meters) above the surrounding terrain in one-quarter mile (0.4 km). The nearest higher neighbor is Elephant Butte, 1.4 miles (2.3 km) to the north-northwest. The landform's toponym has been officially adopted by the U.S. Board on Geographic Names. The name refers to Navajo medicine men praying and giving thanks to the Rain God, who provides water. Streaks from water that seeps out at the base of the sandstone can be seen on the south side of the mesa.

== Geology ==
Rain God Mesa is a mesa composed of three principal strata. The bottom layer is slope-forming Organ Rock Shale, the next stratum is cliff-forming De Chelly Sandstone, and the upper layer is Moenkopi Formation with a Shinarump Conglomerate caprock. The rock ranges in age from Permian at the bottom to Late Triassic at the top. The buttes and mesas of Monument Valley are the result of the Organ Rock Shale being more easily eroded than the overlaying sandstone.

== Climate ==
Spring and fall are the most favorable seasons to visit Rain God Mesa. According to the Köppen climate classification system, it is located in a semi-arid climate zone with cold winters and hot summers. Summers average 54 days above 90 °F (32 °C) annually, and highs rarely exceed 100 °F (38 °C). Summer nights are comfortably cool, and temperatures drop quickly after sunset. Winters are cold, but daytime highs are usually above freezing. Winter temperatures below 0 °F (−18 °C) are uncommon, though possible. This desert climate receives less than 10 inches (250 millimeters) of annual rainfall, and snowfall is generally light during the winter.

== Gallery ==
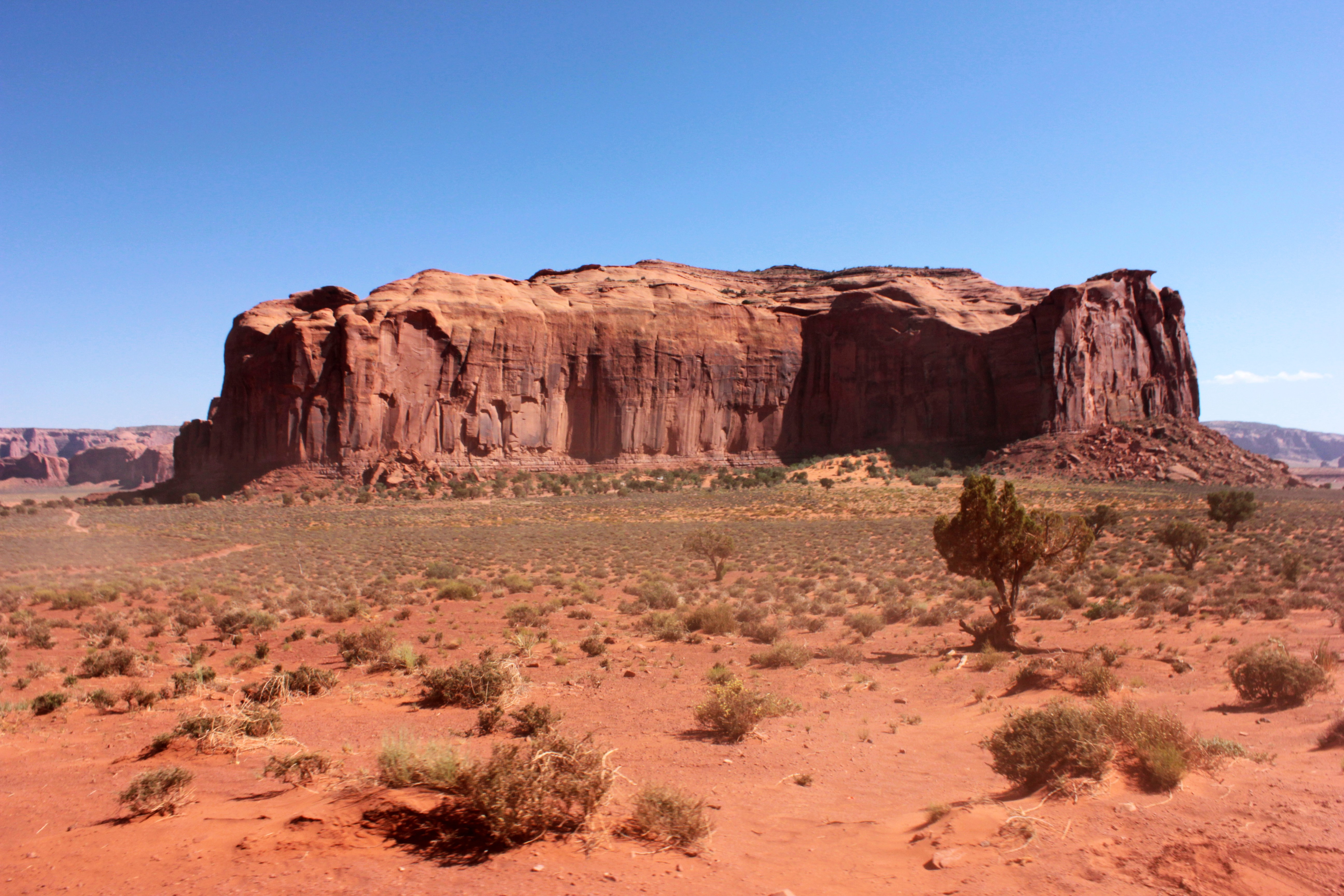
North aspect

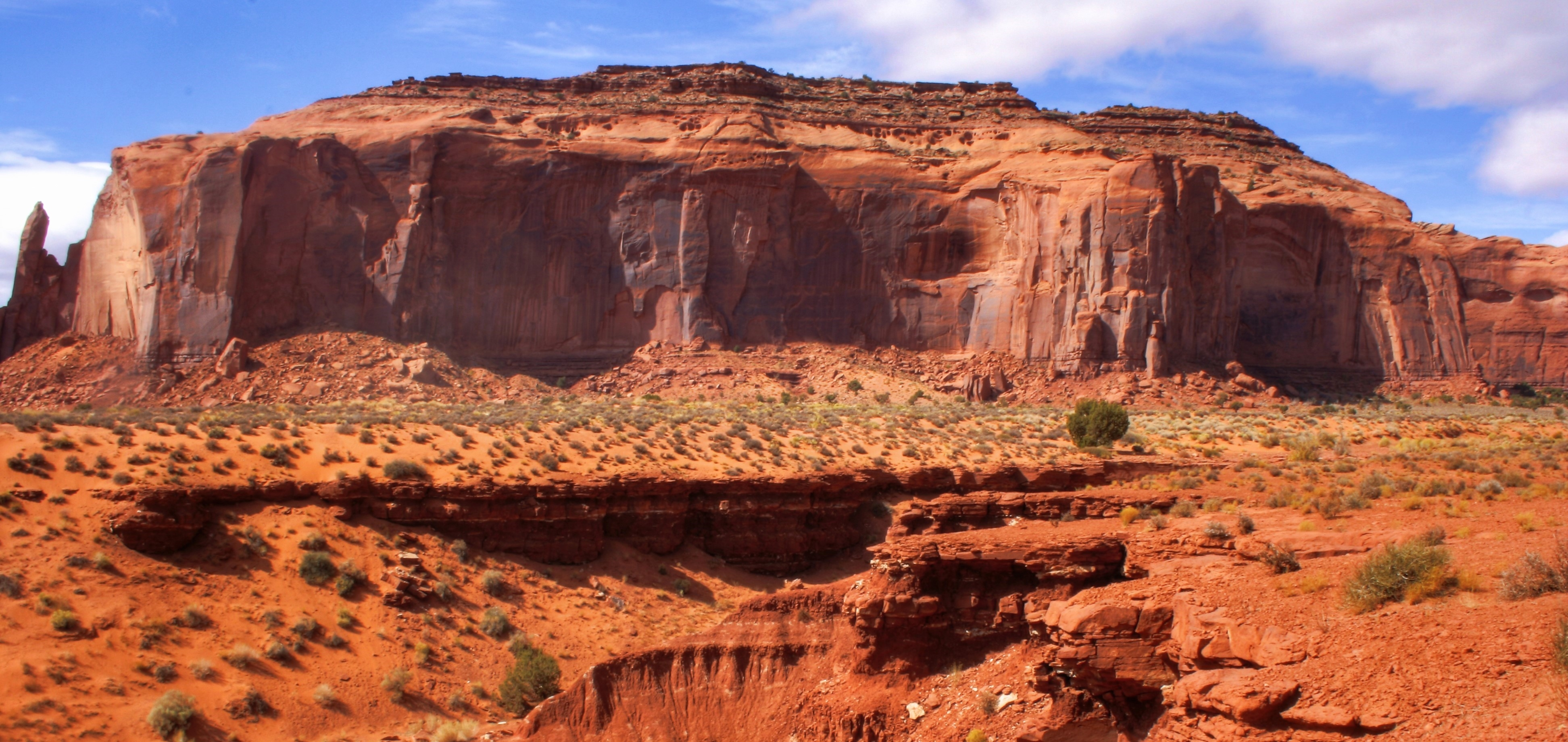
East aspect

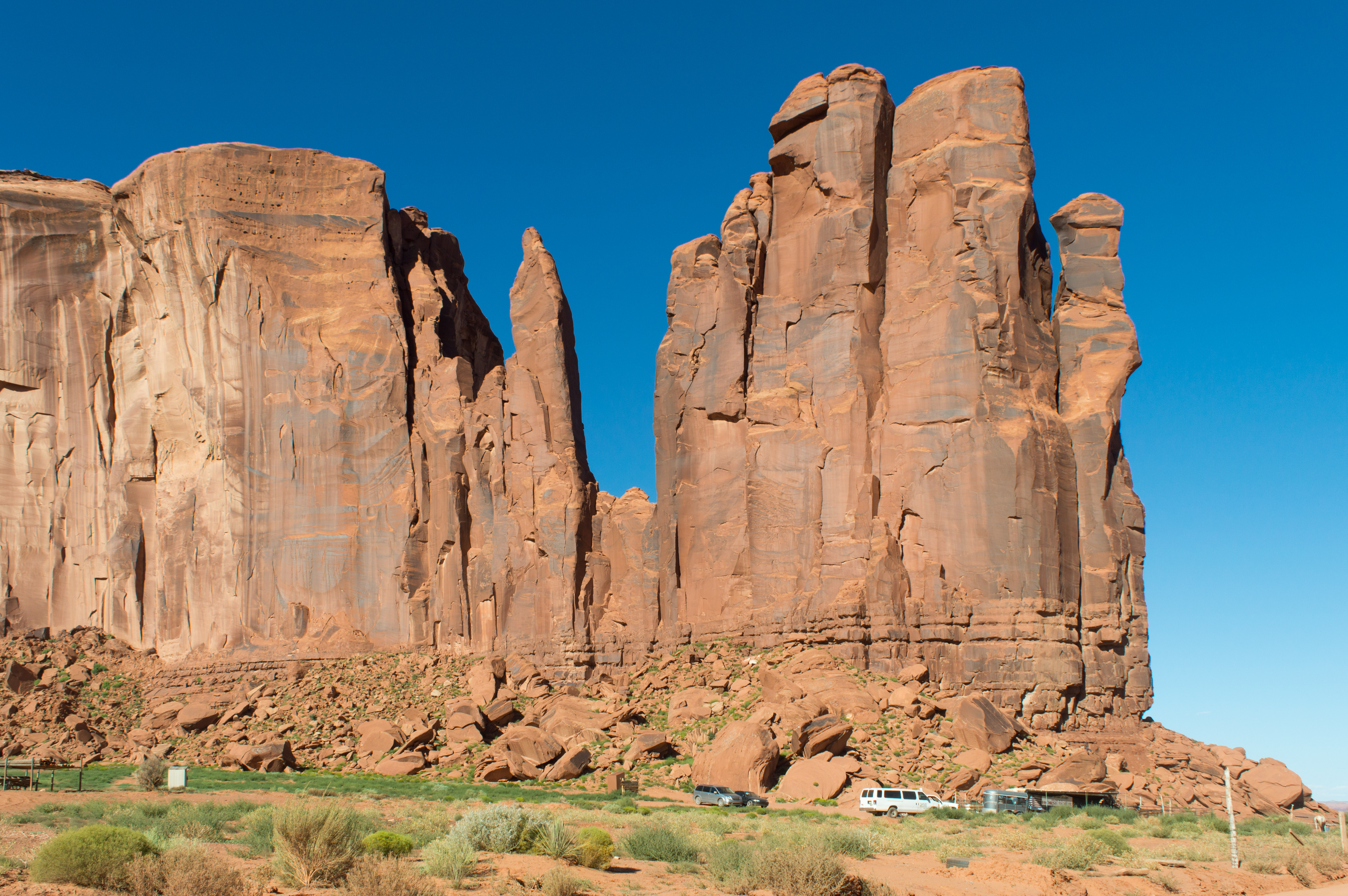
Southernmost tip of Rain God Mesa is unofficially called "The Hand". This is the west aspect.

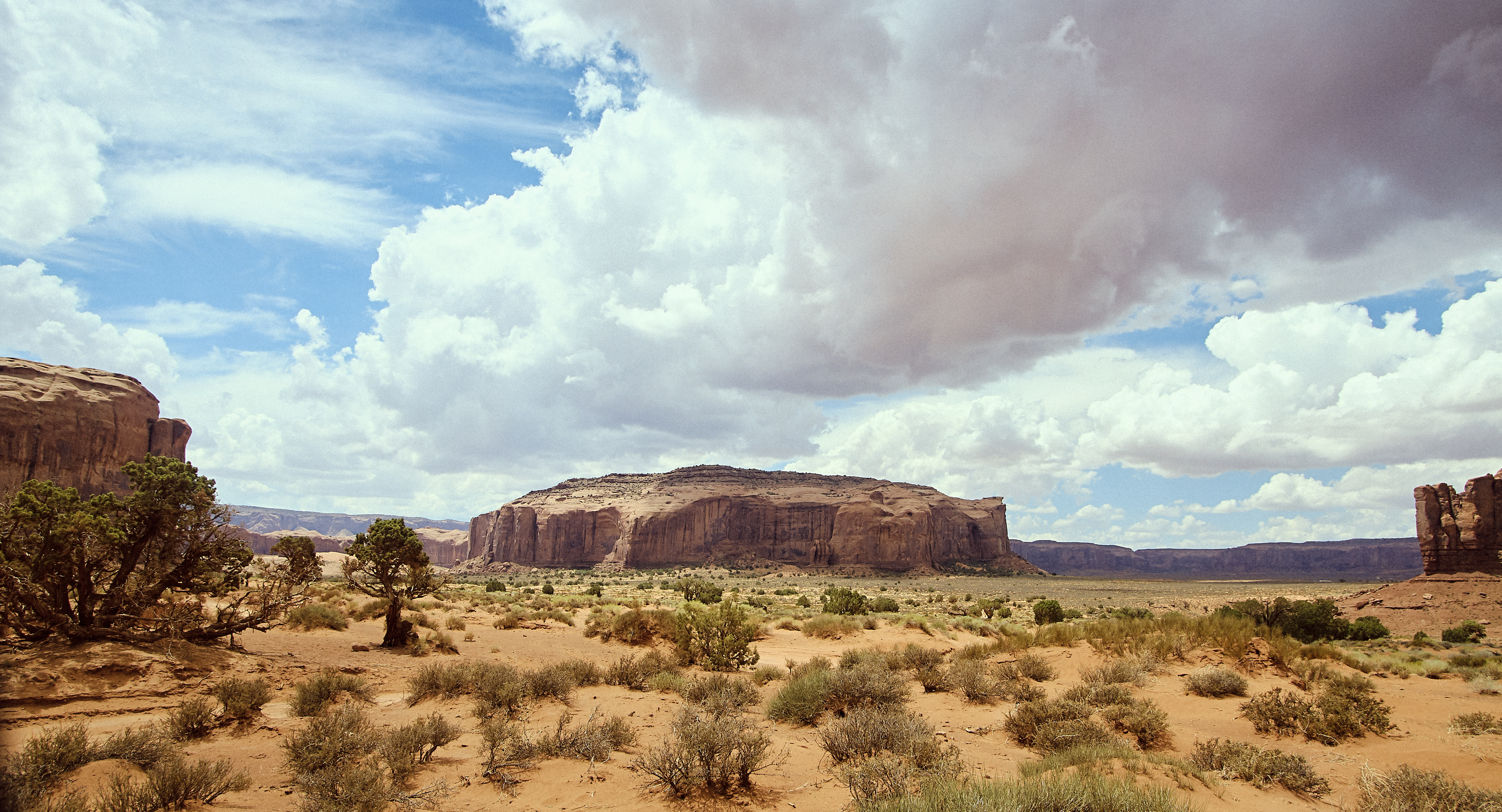
Rain God Mesa

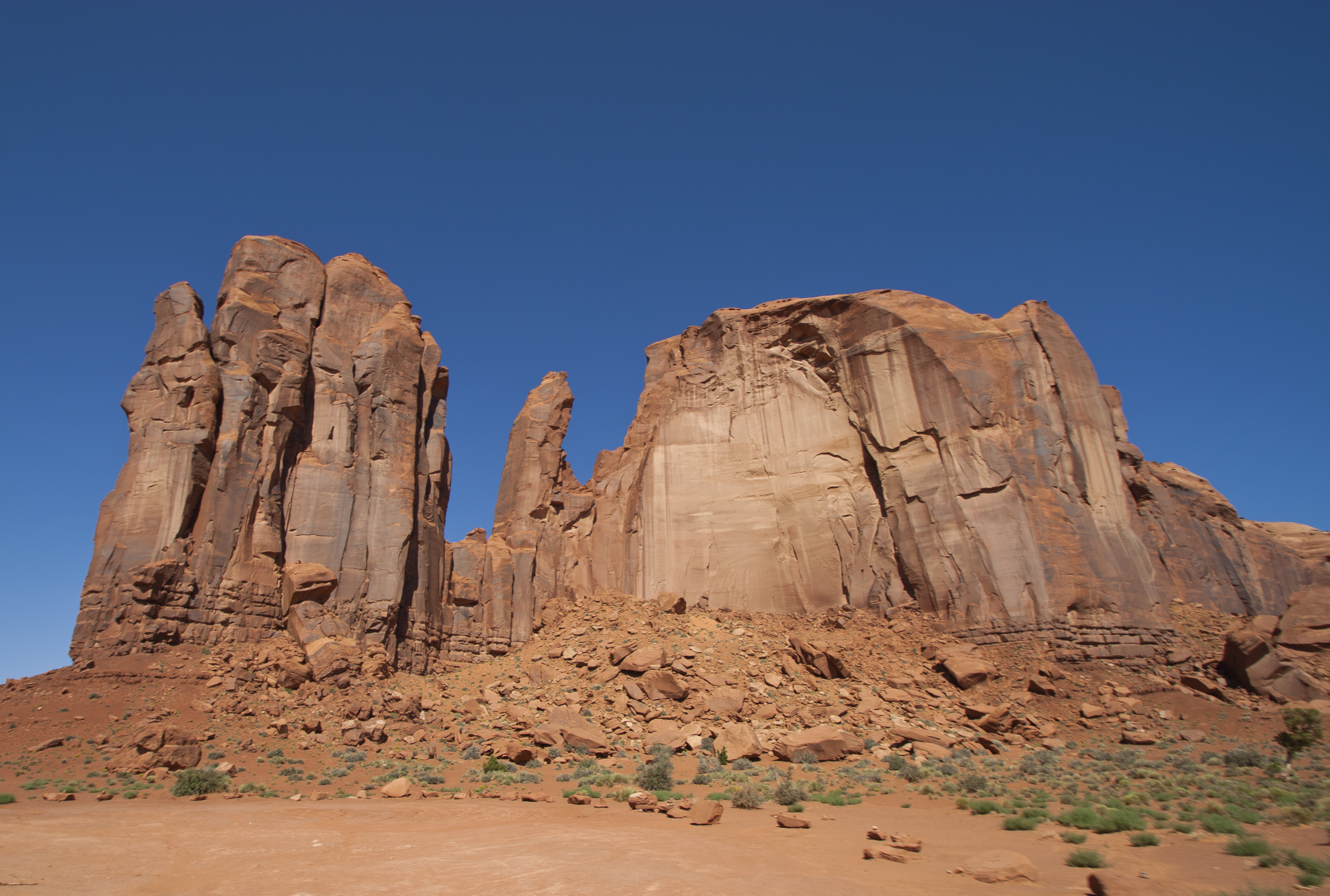
Southeast aspect of The Hand.

== See also ==
- List of mountains in Arizona
- List of appearances of Monument Valley in the media
- Tó Neinilii
