= Hunts Mesa =

Landform in Monument Valley, US

- View of Monument Valley from Hunts Mesa

Highest point
- Elevation: 6,370 ft (1,942 m) NGVD 29
- Coordinates: 36°53′35″N 110°04′18″W

Geography
- Location within Arizona Location within the United States
- Location: Navajo County, Arizona, U.S.
- Topo map: USGS Mitten Buttes

Climbing
- Easiest route: Jeep Trail

Hunts Mesa is a rock formation located in Monument Valley, south of the border between Utah and Arizona in the United States and west of the border between Arizona's Navajo County and Apache County. It is one of two popular interior destinations in the Monument Valley Navajo Tribal Park for tourists to experience panoramic views of the popular sandstone formations from a distance. The other is Mystery Valley. A Navajo guide is required to hike to either.

Hunts Mesa forms the southeastern edge of Monument Valley and the northern edge of Little Capitan Valley. Its elevation is 6,370 feet (1,942 m). Access to Hunts Mesa is not through the general entrance of the park but rather through the sand dunes northeast of the town of Kayenta, Arizona.

On October 16, 1984, a United States Air Force B-52G bomber crashed on Hunts Mesa, killing two of the seven crewmen.
