= Totem Pole (Monument Valley) =

Rock pinnacle in Navajo County, Arizona

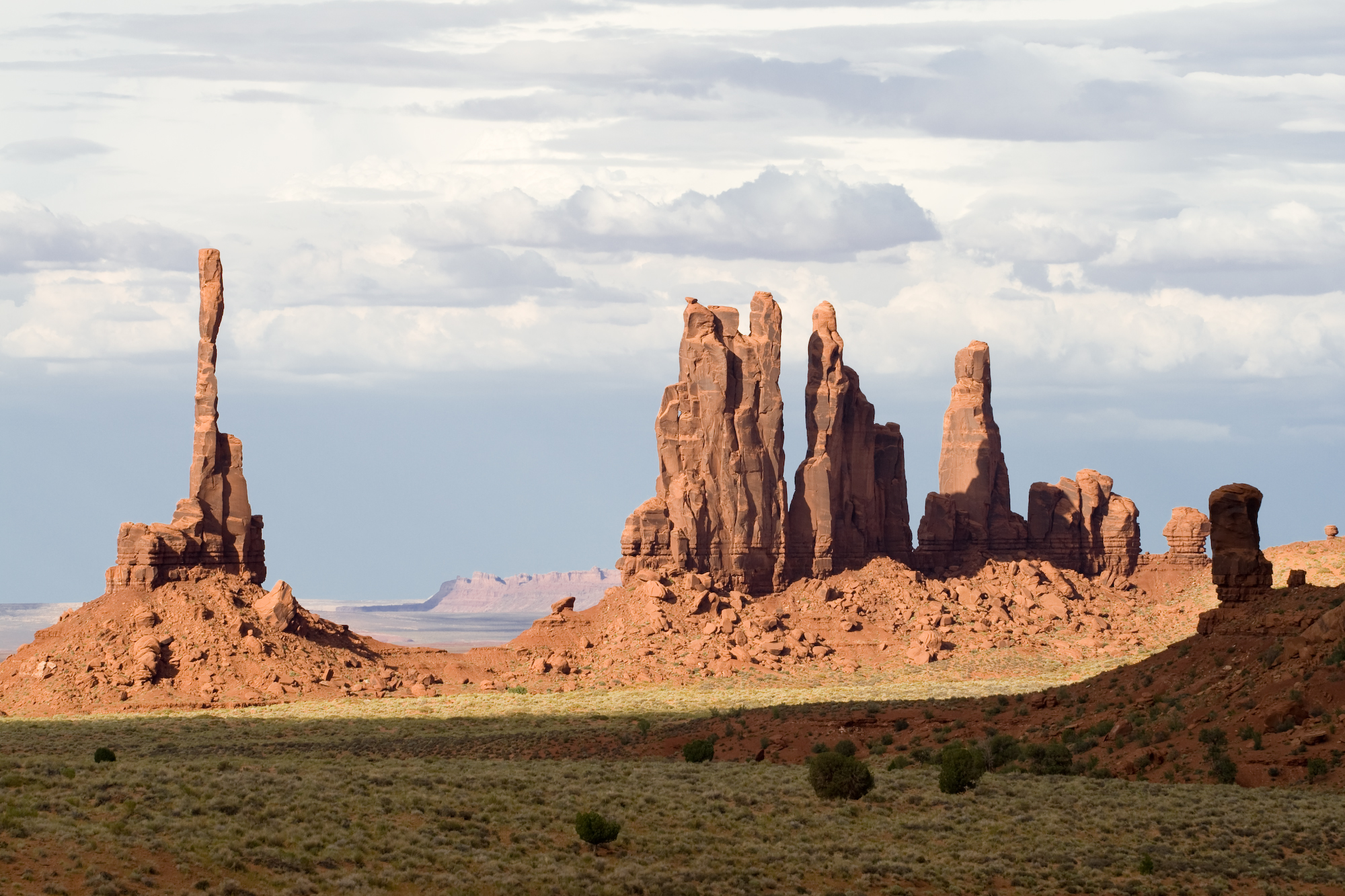
- Totem Pole on the left near Yel-Bichel

Highest point
- Elevation: 5,621 ft (1,713 m) NGVD 29
- Prominence: 381 ft (116 m)
- Coordinates: 36°55′44″N 110°02′51″W

Geography
- Location within Arizona Location within the United States
- Location: Navajo County, Arizona, U.S.
- Topo map: Mitten Buttes

Geology
- Mountain type: Sandstone pillar

The Totem Pole is a pillar or rock spire found in Monument Valley. It is a highly eroded remnant of a butte.

Deserts at the end of the Permian period, 260 million years ago, formed the De Chelly and Wingate Sandstones that make up the buttes, totems, and mesas in Monument Valley.

The Totem Pole rises next to a gathering of thicker spires the Navajo call Yei Bi Chei and can be seen via a self-guided Valley Drive.

== Rock climbing ==
The Totem Pole was first climbed June 11–13, 1957 by Bill Feuerer, Jerry Gallwas, Mark Powell and Don Wilson. The first ascent route is rated 5.10 YDS A2 in the Yosemite Decimal System. A second route called "Never Never Land" was climbed in 1979.

Parts of the 1975 thriller film The Eiger Sanction (U.S. director Clint Eastwood) were filmed at Totem Pole. According to author Ron Hogan, "[i]n addition to directing and starring in The Eiger Sanction, Clint Eastwood did all his own stunts during the mountain-climbing sequences." Hogan further adds that, Eastwood and his film crew "were the last people to climb Monument Valley's Totem Pole; in order to gain permission for the shoot, they had to agree to clear the mountainside of all the pitons from previous climbing expeditions".
