= Cly Butte =

Butte in Navajo County, Arizona, United States

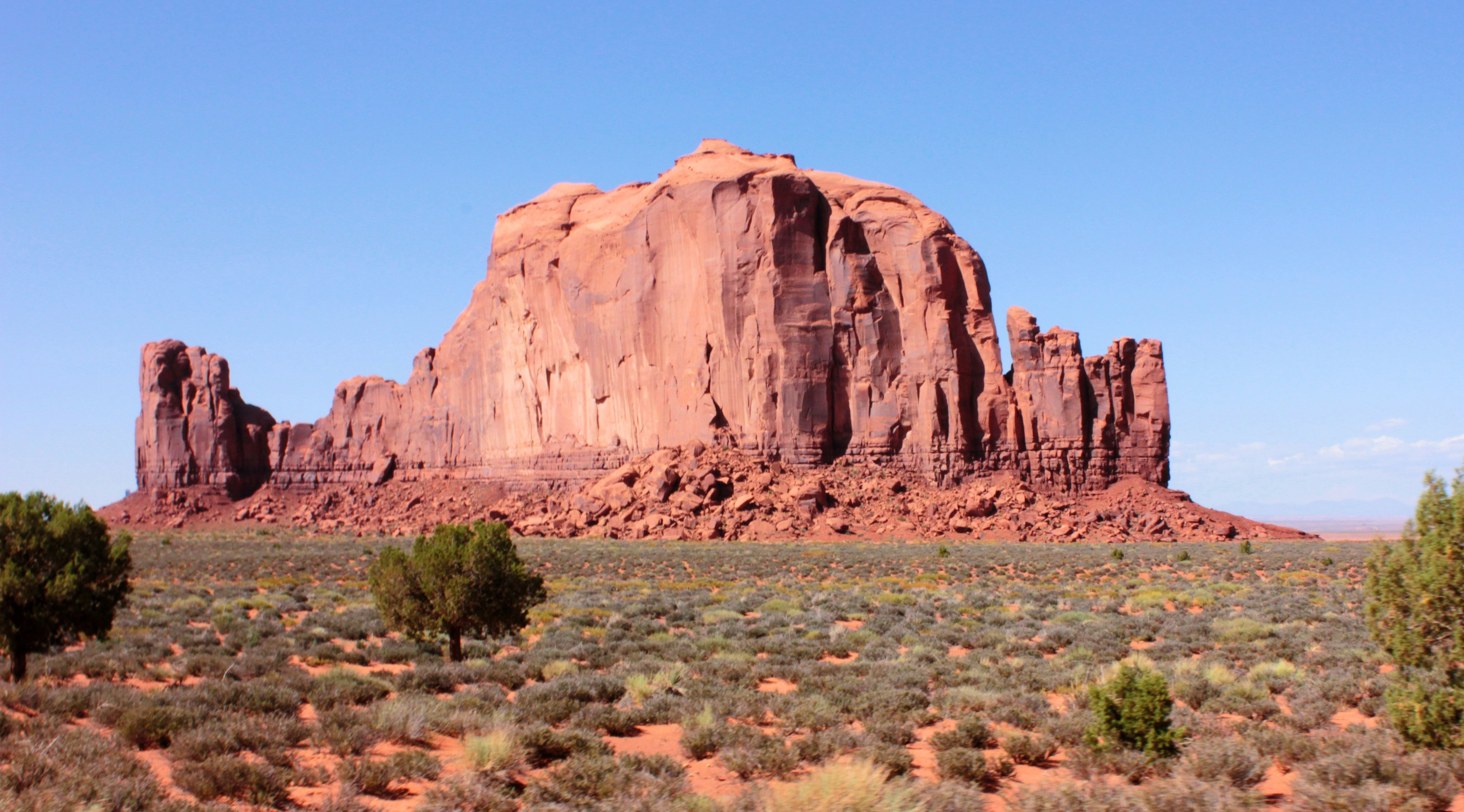
- Southwest aspect

Highest point
- Elevation: 5,820 ft (1,774 m)
- Prominence: 520 ft (158 m)
- Parent peak: Camel Butte (5,847 ft)
- Isolation: 0.49 mi (0.79 km)
- Coordinates: 36°57′17″N 110°04′08″W

Geography
- Location within Arizona Location within the United States
- Location: Monument Valley; Navajo County, Arizona, U.S.
- Parent range: Colorado Plateau
- Topo map: USGS Mitten Buttes

Geology
- Rock age: Permian
- Mountain type: Butte
- Rock type: Sandstone

Cly Butte is a 5,820-foot-elevation (1,774-meter) summit in Navajo County, Arizona, United States.

== Description ==
Cly Butte is situated three miles (4.8 km) southeast of the Monument Valley visitor center on Navajo Nation land. Precipitation runoff from this butte's slopes drains to Gypsum Creek which is a tributary of the San Juan River. Topographic relief is significant as the summit rises 600 feet (183 meters) above the surrounding terrain in 0.1 mile (0.16 km). The nearest higher neighbor is Camel Butte, 0.5 miles (0.80 km) to the west. The landform's toponym has been officially adopted by the U.S. Board on Geographic Names, and the name refers to a Navajo chief named Cly who is buried at the base of this butte.

== Geology ==
Cly Butte is a butte composed of two principal strata. The bottom layer is slope-forming Organ Rock Shale and the upper stratum is cliff-forming De Chelly Sandstone. The rock was deposited during the Permian period. The buttes and mesas of Monument Valley are the result of the Organ Rock Shale being more easily eroded than the overlaying sandstone.

== Climate ==
Spring and fall are the most favorable seasons to visit Cly Butte. According to the Köppen climate classification system, it is located in a semi-arid climate zone with cold winters and hot summers. Summers average 54 days above 90 °F (32 °C) annually, and highs rarely exceed 100 °F (38 °C). Summer nights are comfortably cool, and temperatures drop quickly after sunset. Winters are cold, but daytime highs are usually above freezing. Winter temperatures below 0 °F (−18 °C) are uncommon, though possible. This desert climate receives less than 10 inches (250 millimeters) of annual rainfall, and snowfall is generally light during the winter.

== Gallery ==
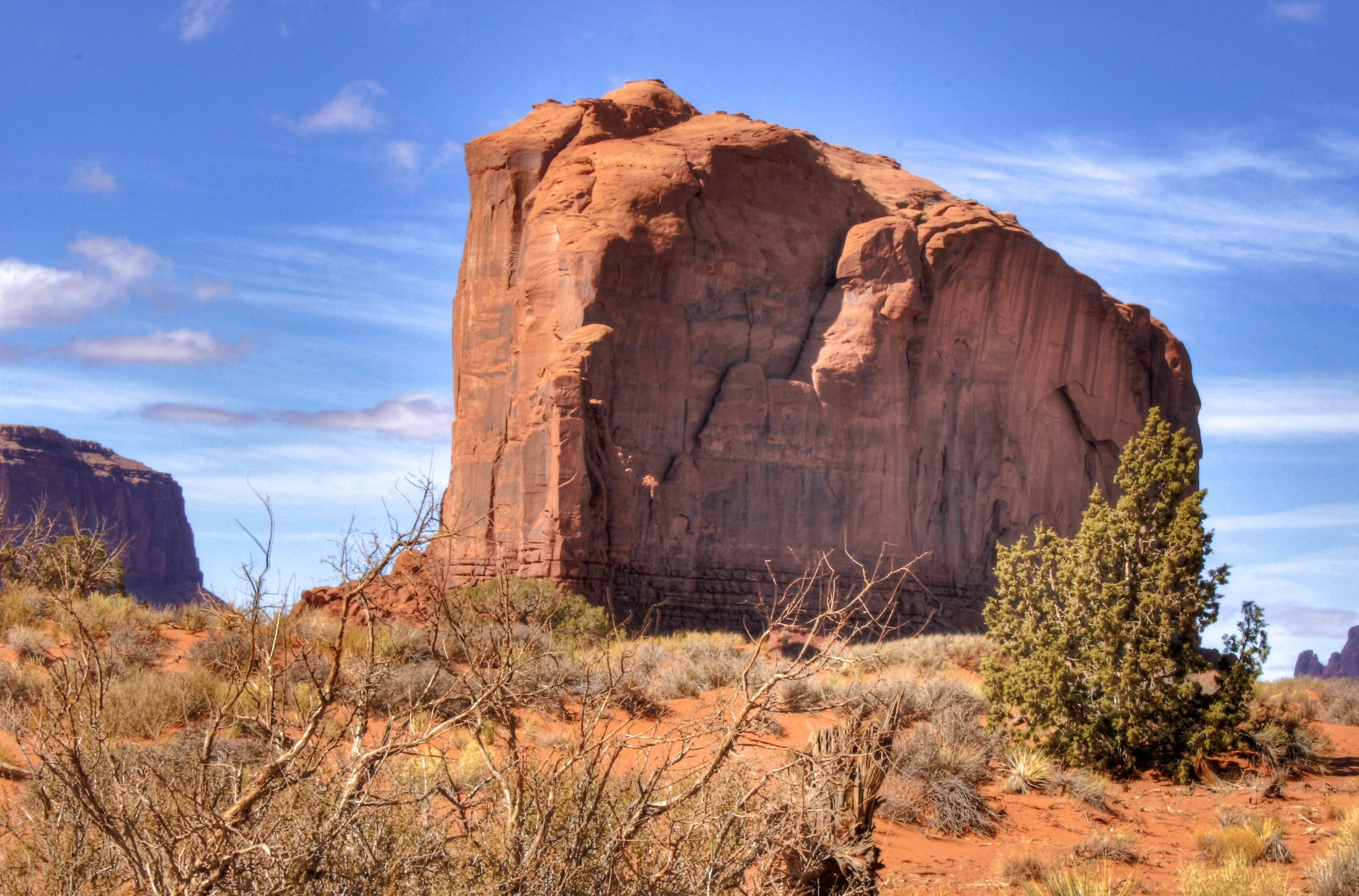
Southeast aspect

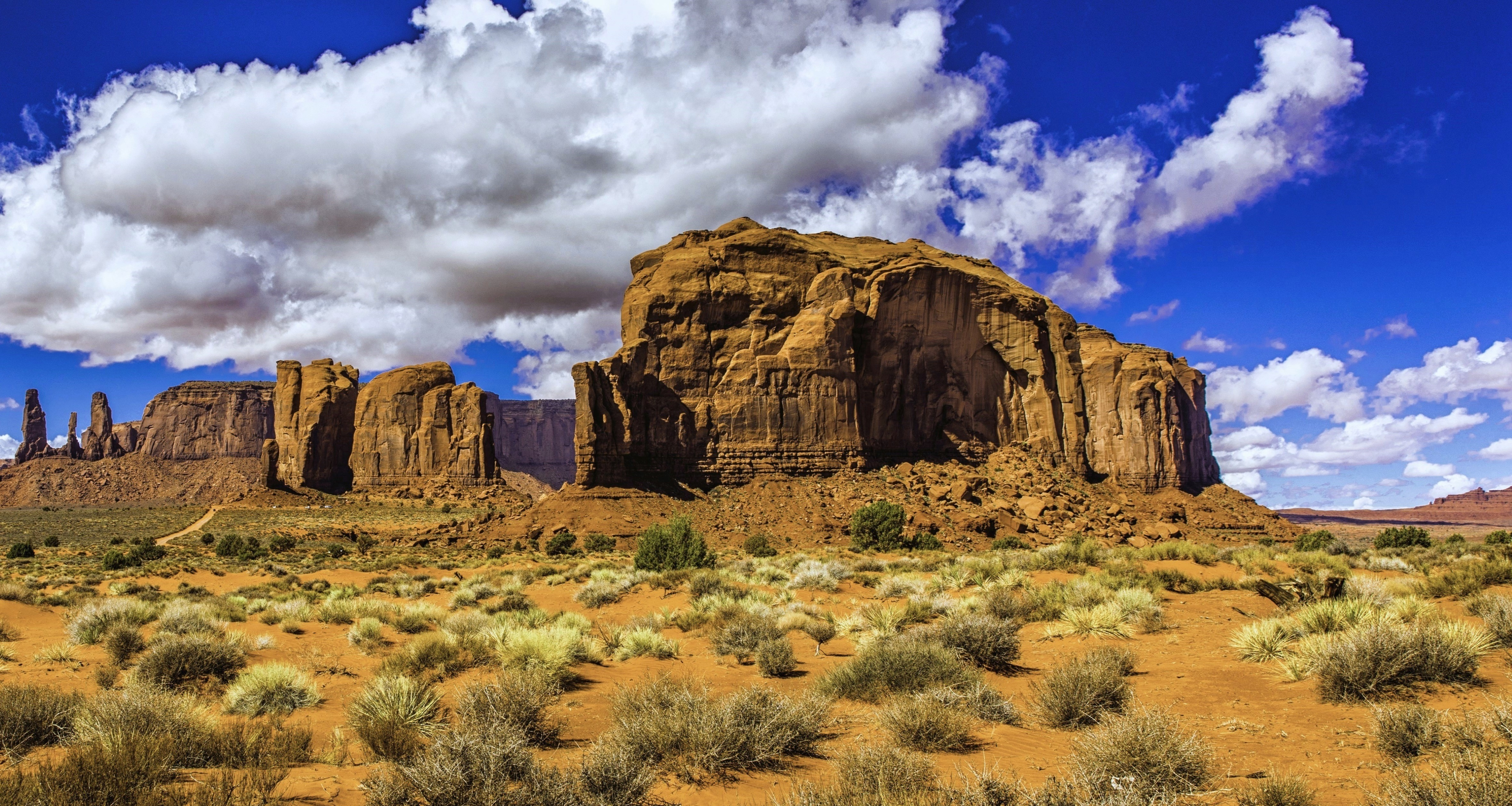
East aspect

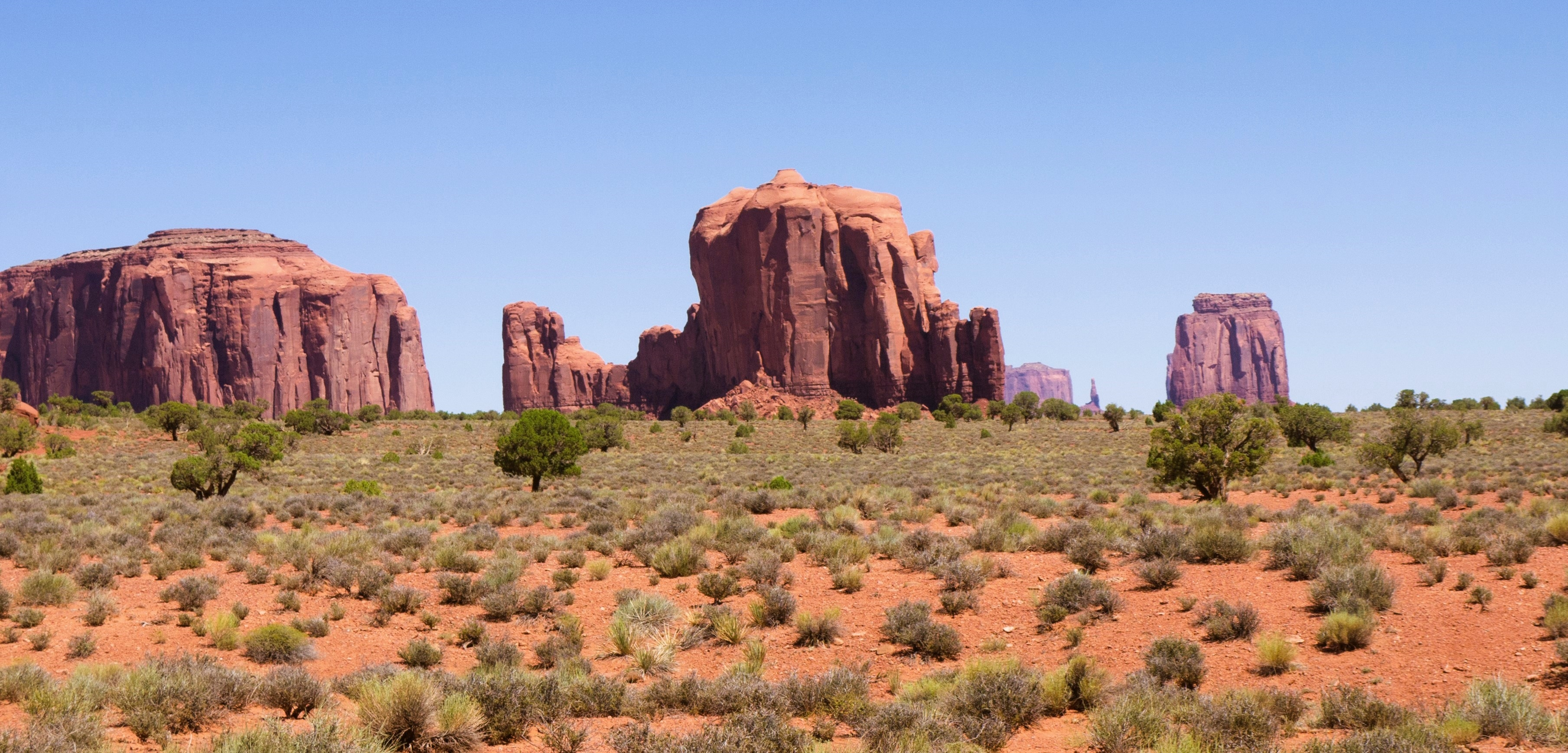
South aspect of Cly Butte centered

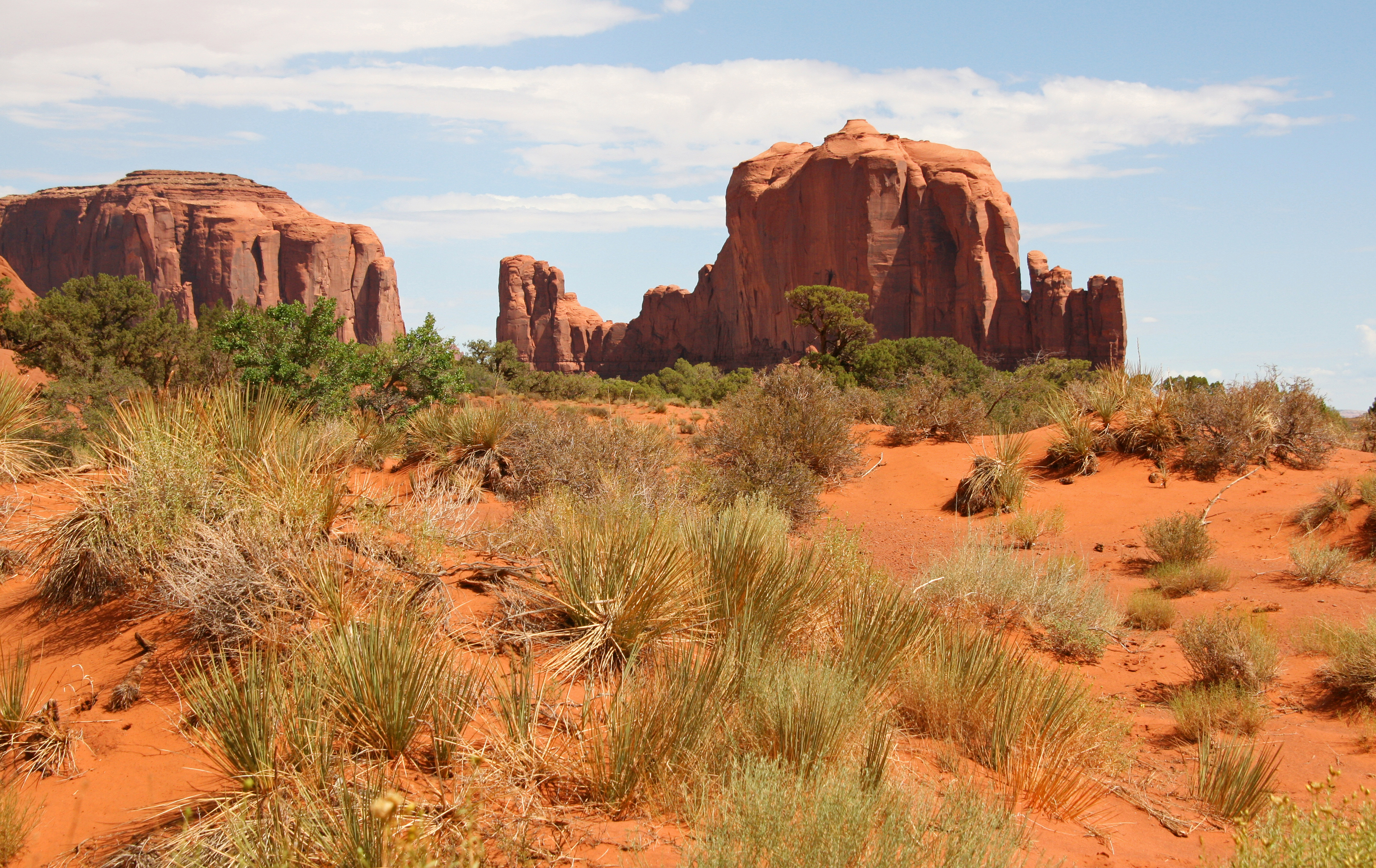
South aspect of Cly Butte (right)

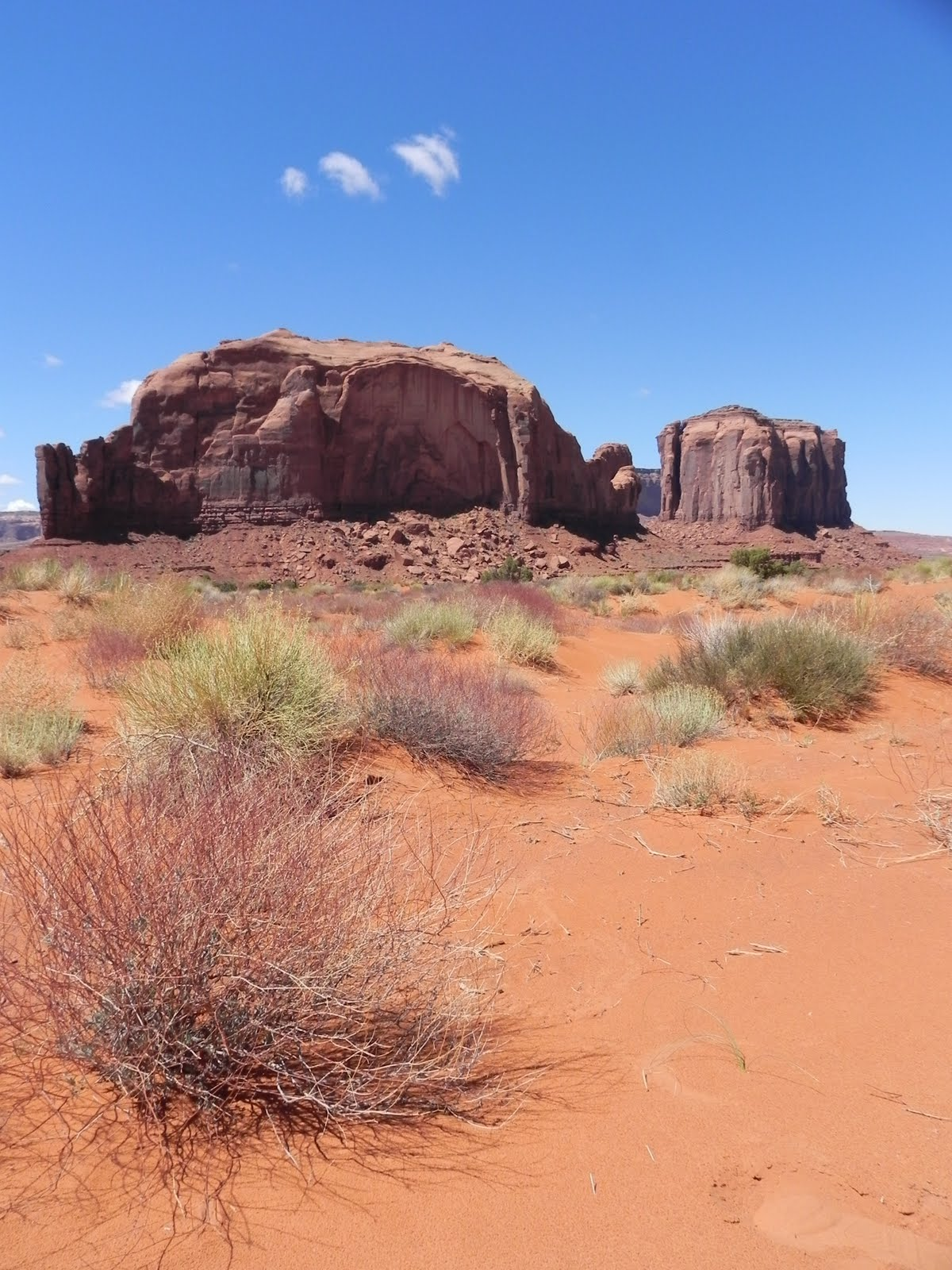
East aspect of Cly Butte (left) with Elephant Butte (right)

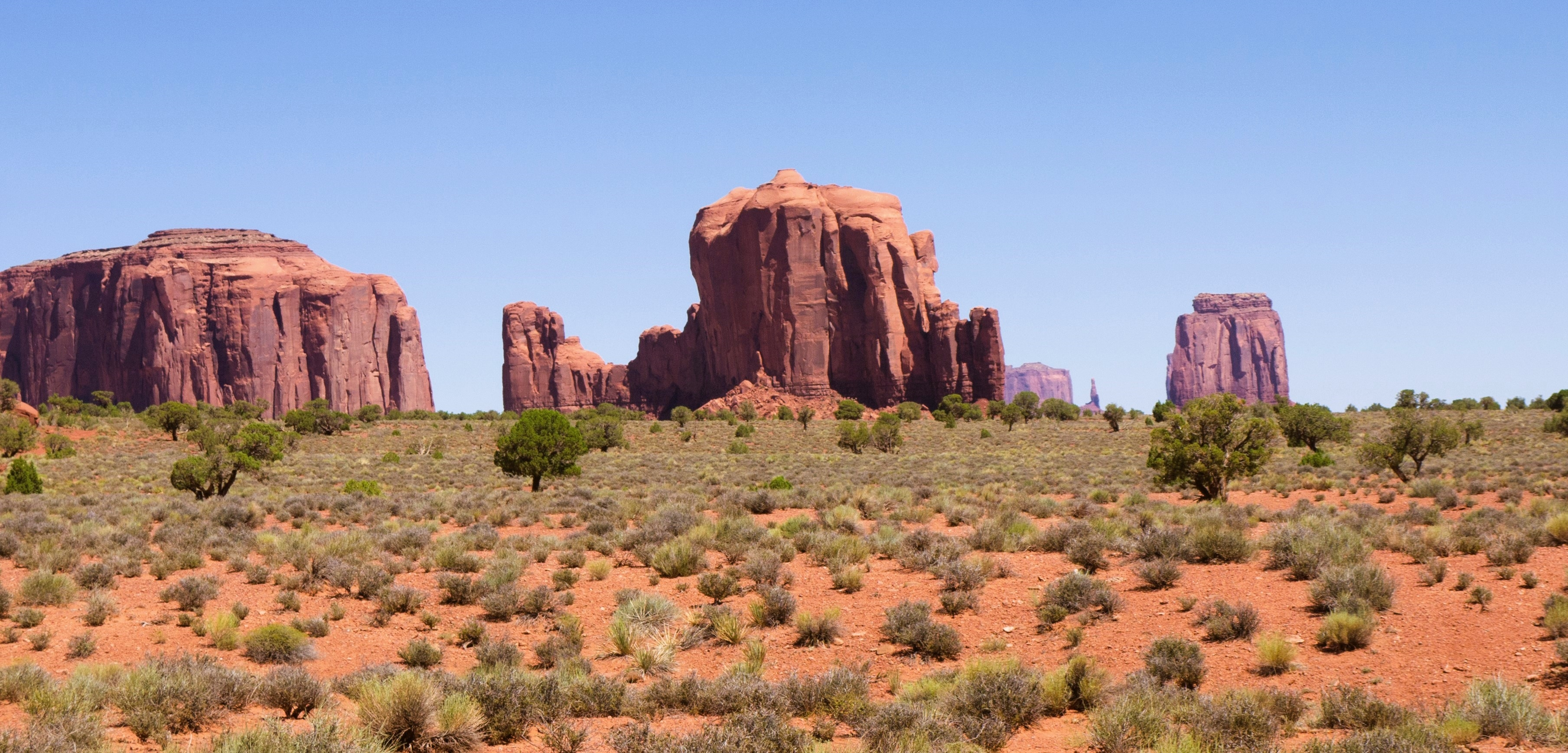
South aspect of Cly Butte centered

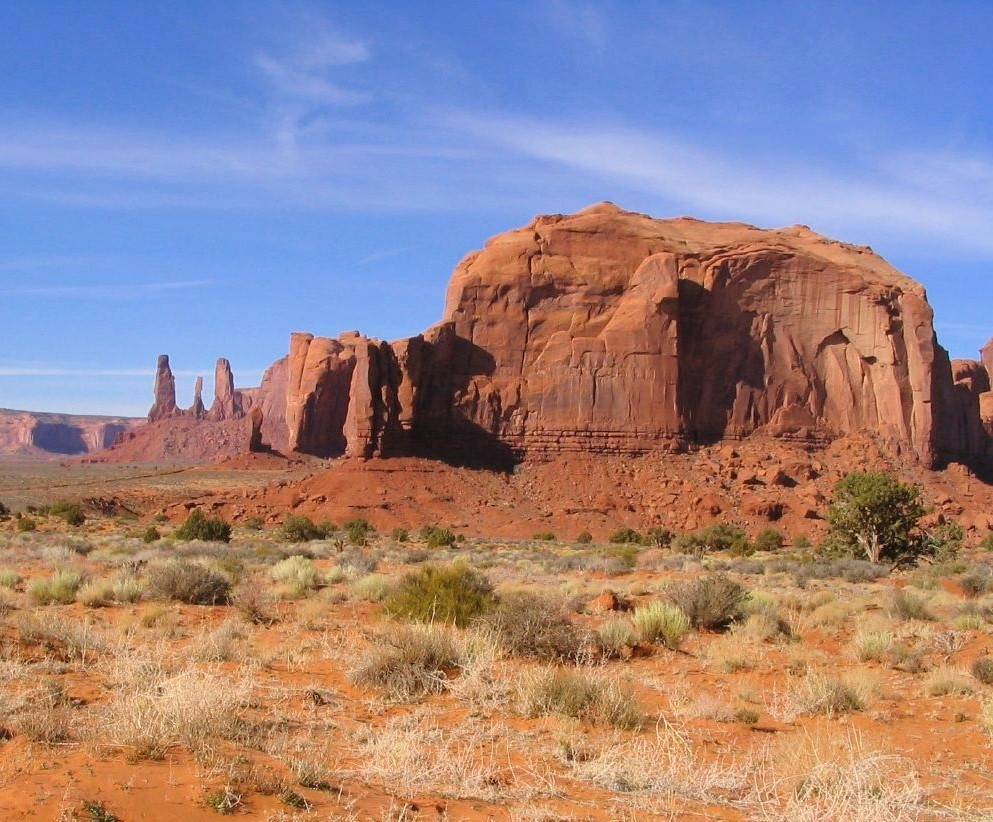
East aspect

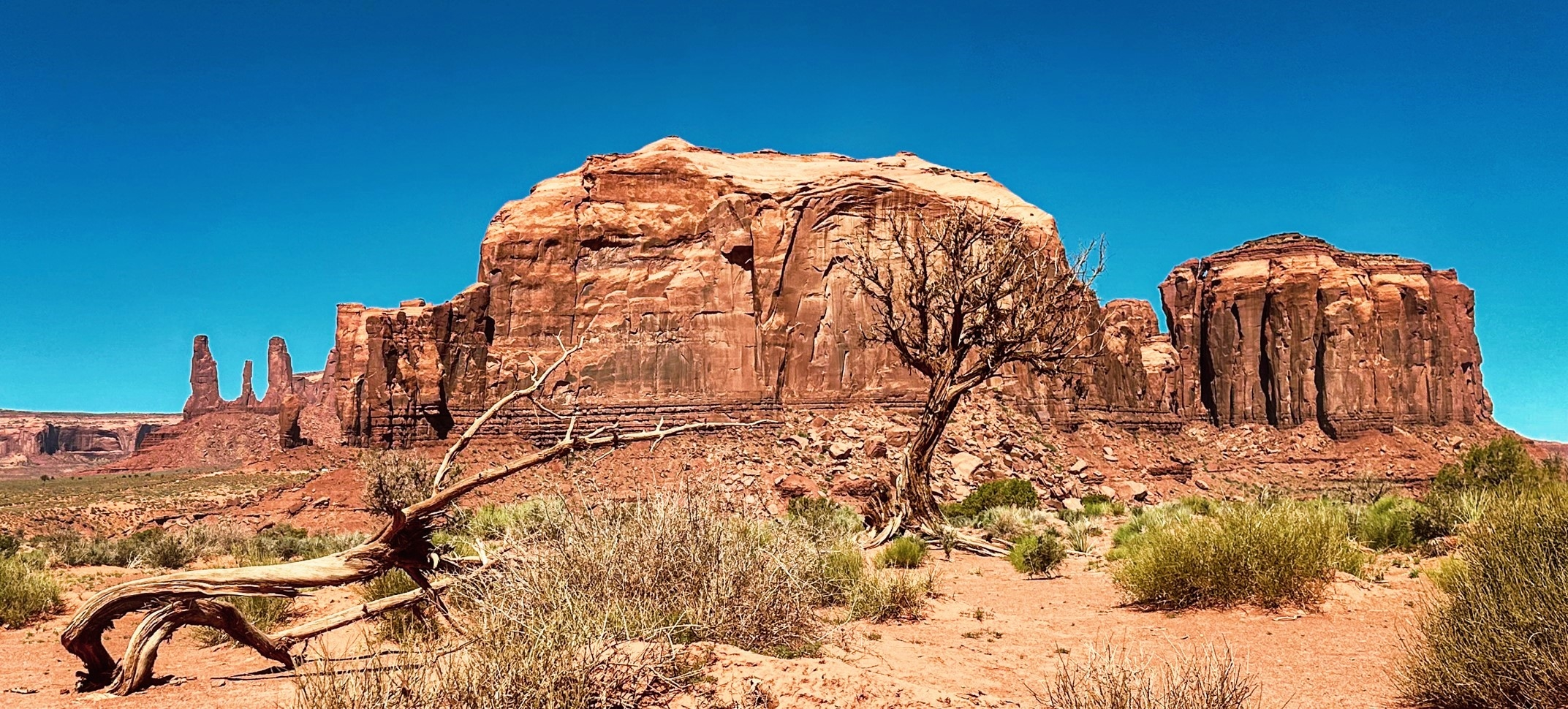
Cly Butte centered, Elephant Butte to right, Three Sisters to left.

== See also ==
- List of mountains of Arizona
- List of appearances of Monument Valley in the media
