= Elephant Butte (Monument Valley) =

Butte in Navajo County, Arizona, United States

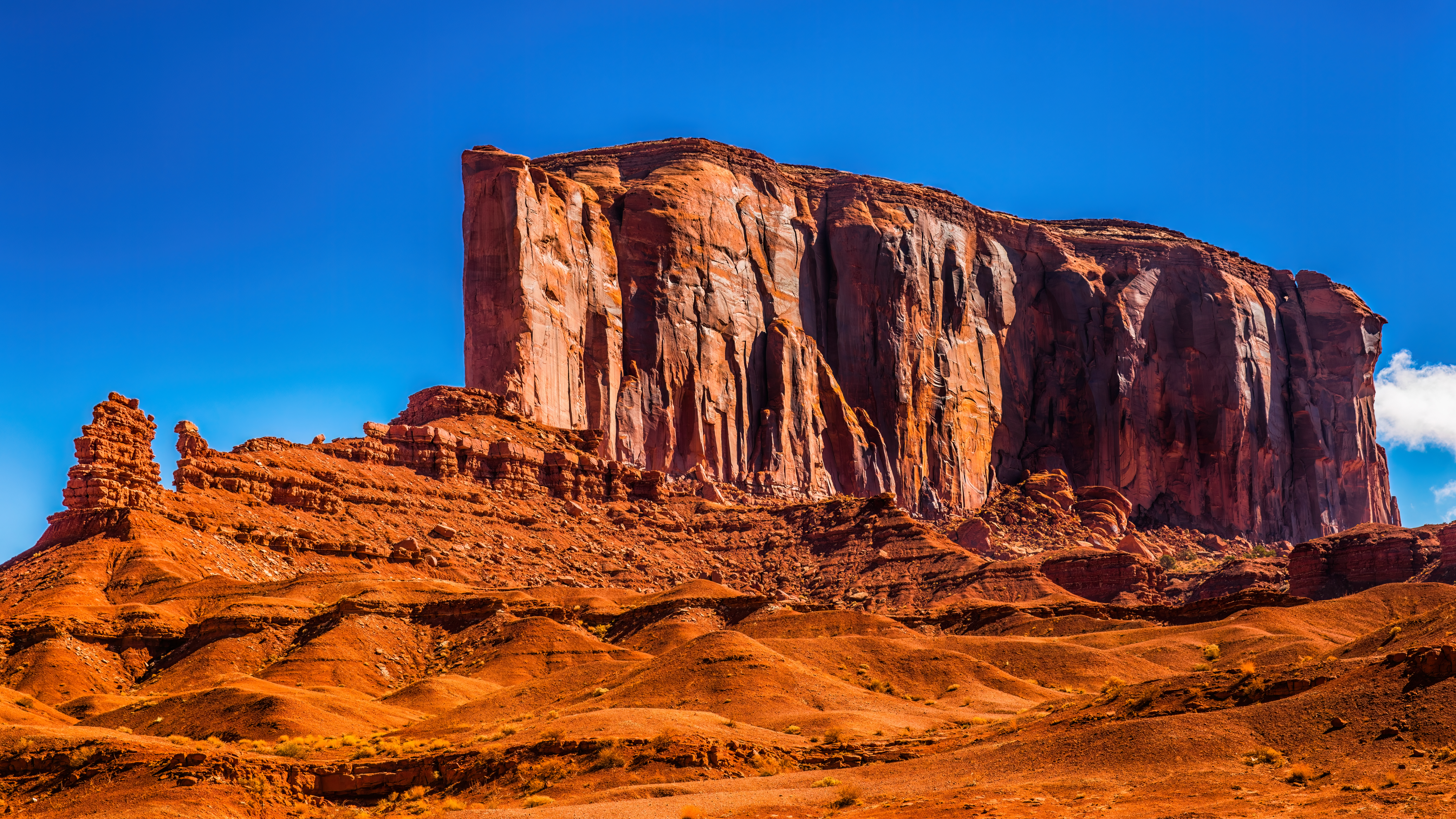
- West-southwest aspect

Highest point
- Elevation: 5,981 ft (1,823 m)
- Prominence: 681 ft (208 m)
- Parent peak: Mitchell Mesa (6,586 ft)
- Isolation: 1.42 mi (2.29 km)
- Coordinates: 36°57′42″N 110°04′41″W

Geography
- Location within Arizona Location within the United States
- Location: Monument Valley; Navajo County, Arizona, U.S.
- Parent range: Colorado Plateau
- Topo map: USGS Mitten Buttes

Geology
- Mountain type: Butte
- Rock type: Sandstone

Elephant Butte is a 5,981-foot-elevation (1,823-meter) summit in Navajo County, Arizona, United States.

== Description ==
Elephant Butte is situated 2.3 miles (3.7 km) southeast of the Monument Valley visitor center on Navajo Nation land. Precipitation runoff from this butte's slopes drains into Gypsum Creek which is a tributary of the San Juan River. Topographic relief is significant as the summit rises 900 feet (274 meters) above the surrounding terrain in 0.25 mile (0.4 km). The nearest higher neighbor is Three Sisters, 1.4 miles (2.3 km) to the southwest. The landform's toponym has been officially adopted by the U.S. Board on Geographic Names, and the descriptive name refers to the resemblance of an elephant's profile viewed from a south perspective.

== Geology ==
Elephant Butte is a butte composed of three principal strata. The bottom layer is slope-forming Organ Rock Shale, the next stratum is cliff-forming De Chelly Sandstone, and the upper layer is Moenkopi Formation. The rock ranges in age from Permian at the bottom to Early Triassic at the top. The buttes and mesas of Monument Valley are the result of the Organ Rock Shale being more easily eroded than the overlaying sandstone.

== Climate ==
Spring and fall are the most favorable seasons to visit Elephant Butte. According to the Köppen climate classification system, it is located in a semi-arid climate zone with cold winters and hot summers. Summers average 54 days above 90 °F (32 °C) annually, and highs rarely exceed 100 °F (38 °C). Summer nights are comfortably cool, and temperatures drop quickly after sunset. Winters are cold, but daytime highs are usually above freezing. Winter temperatures below 0 °F (−18 °C) are uncommon, though possible. This desert climate receives less than 10 inches (250 millimeters) of annual rainfall, and snowfall is generally light during the winter.

== Gallery ==
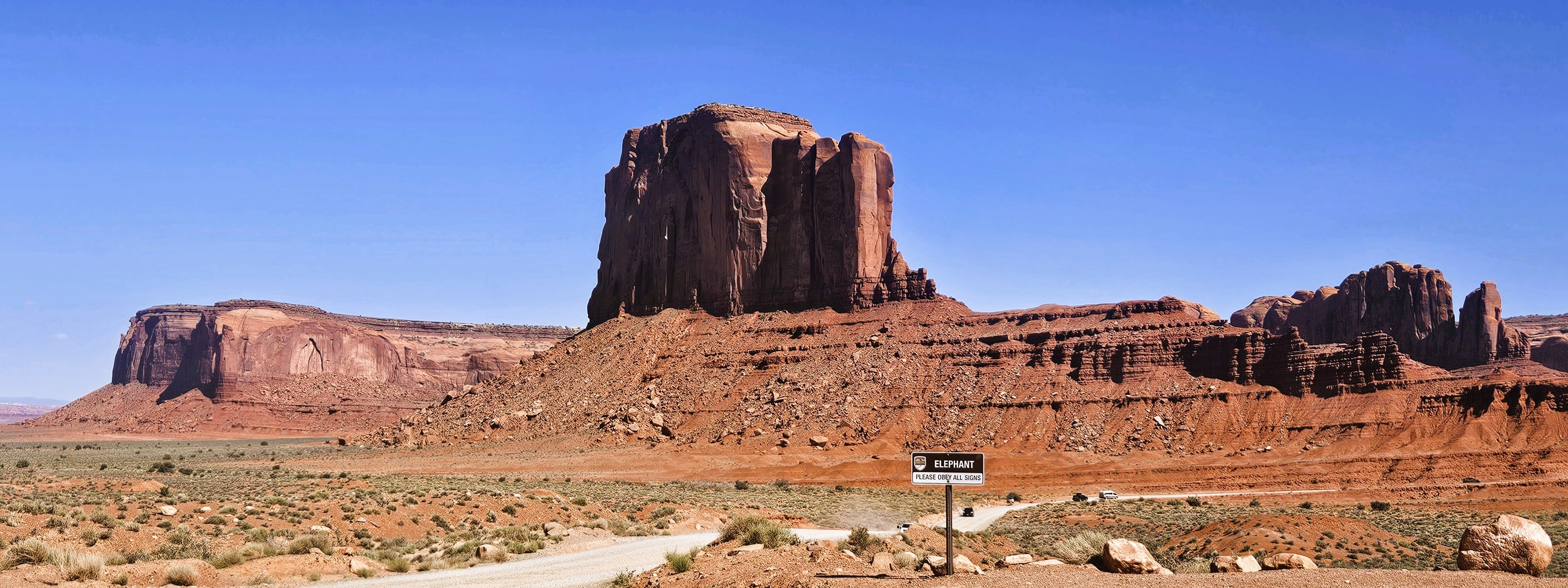
Northwest aspect

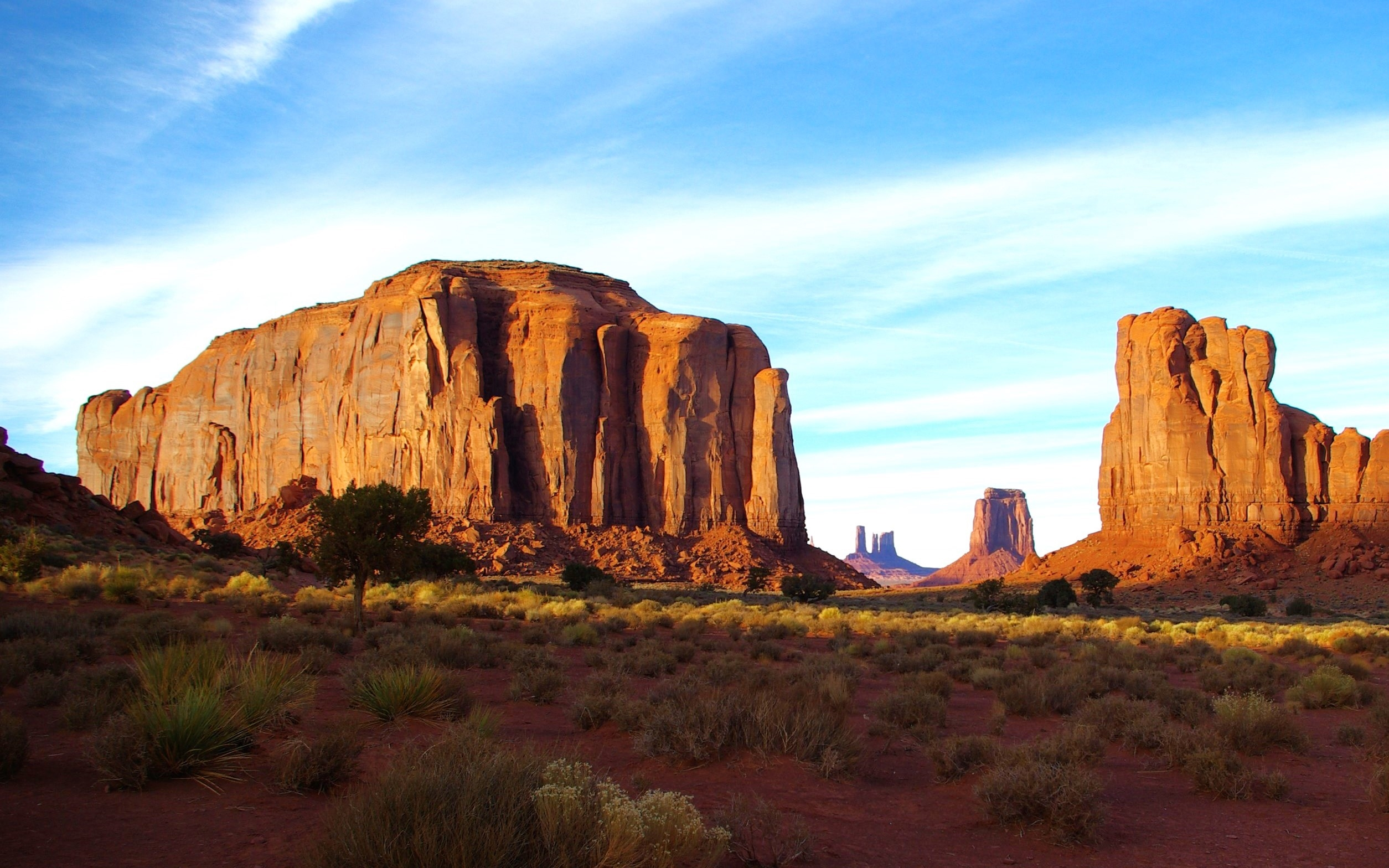
Looking north through Monument Valley's North Window Viewpoint.
South aspect of Elephant Butte to the left.

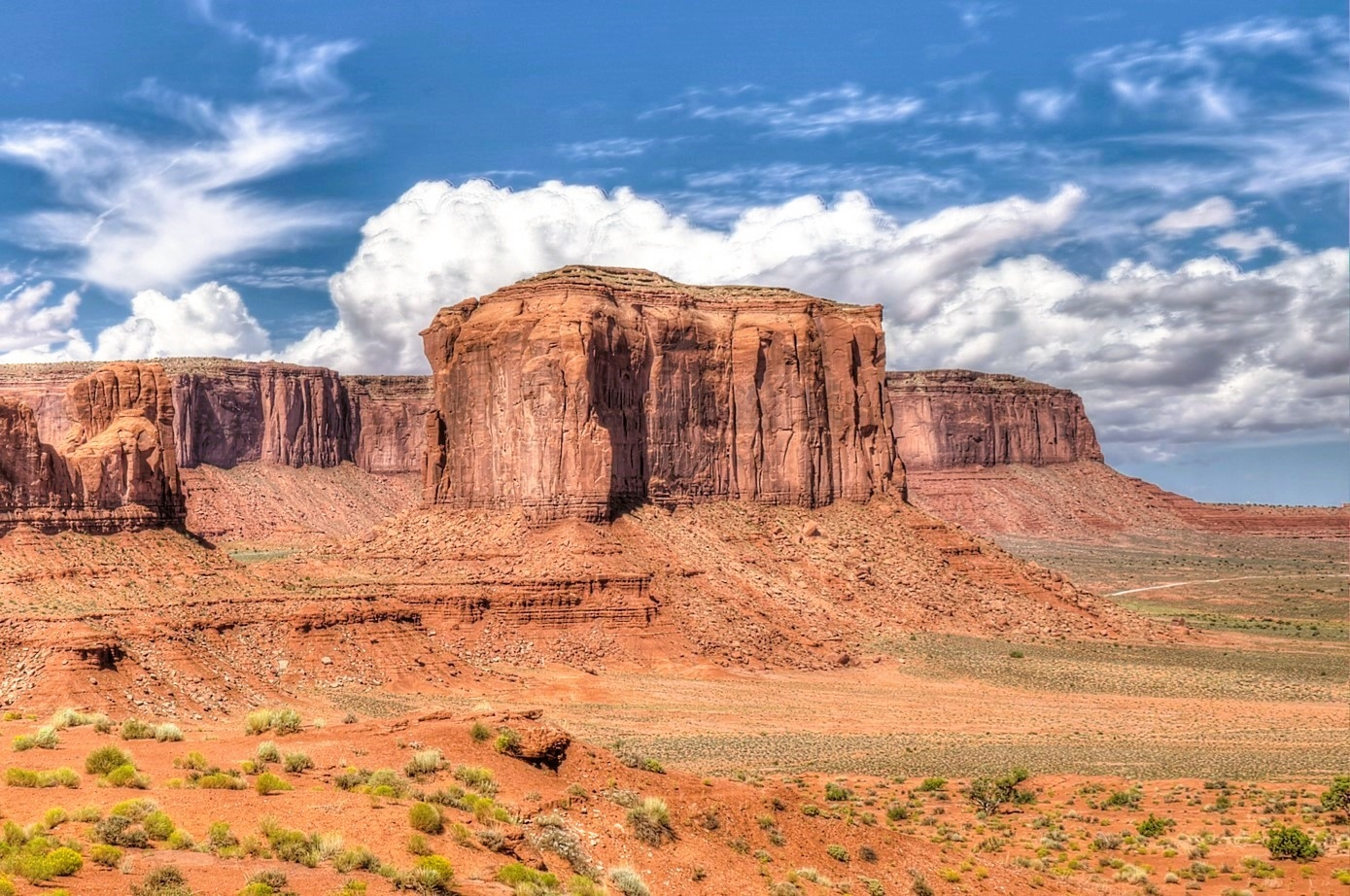
East aspect

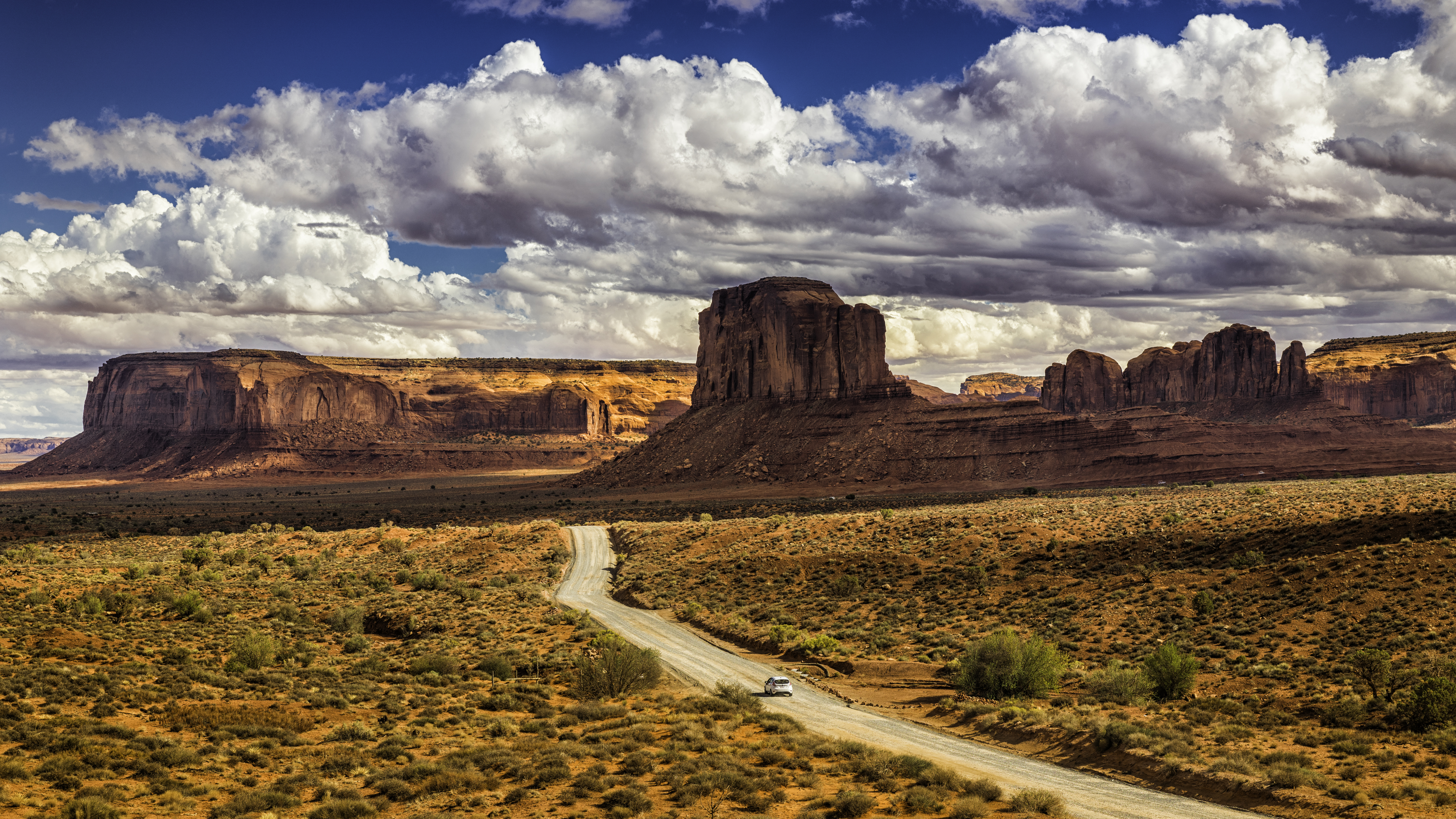
Spearhead Mesa (left), Elephant Butte (center), Camel Butte (right)

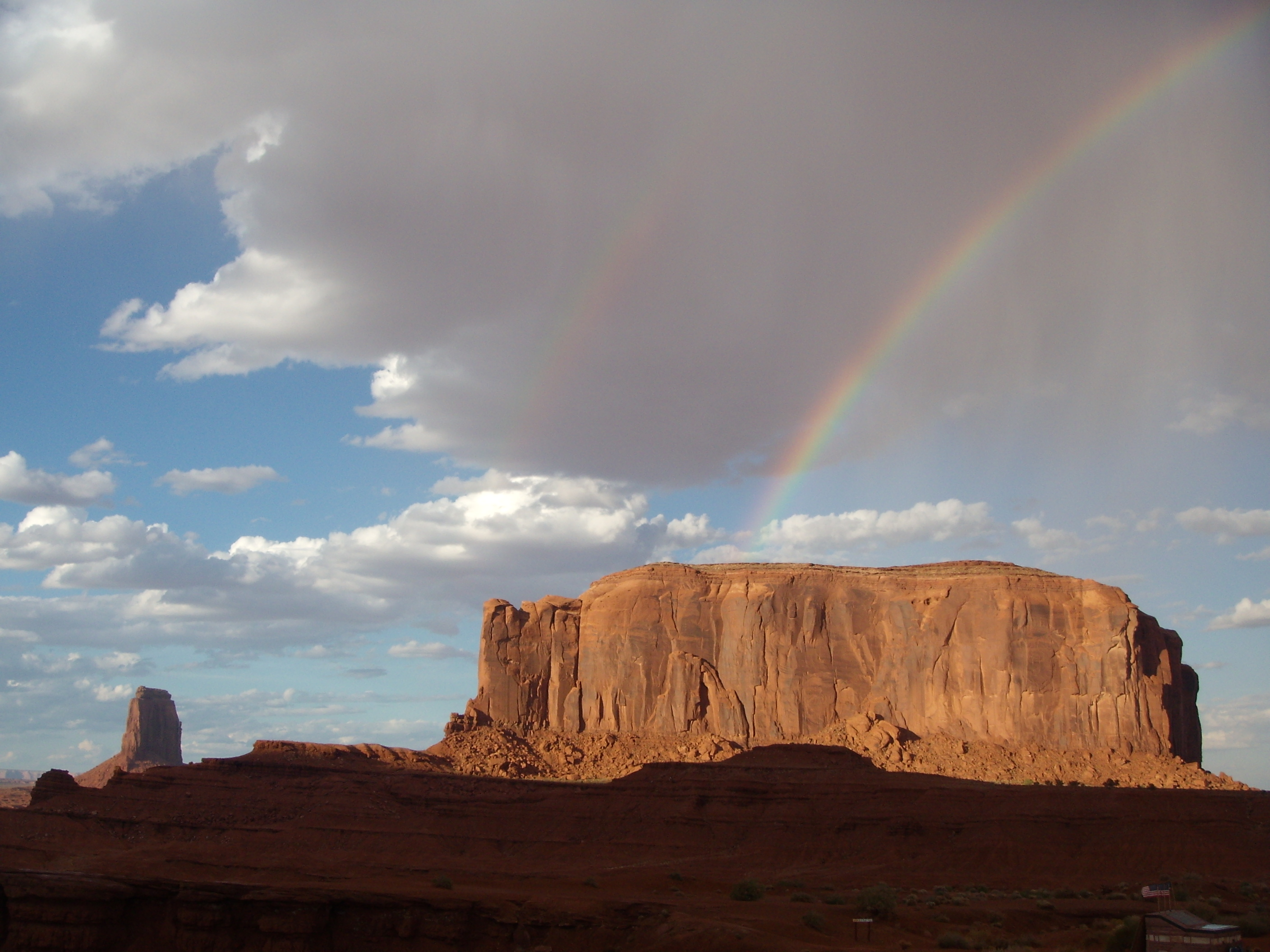
Southwest aspect

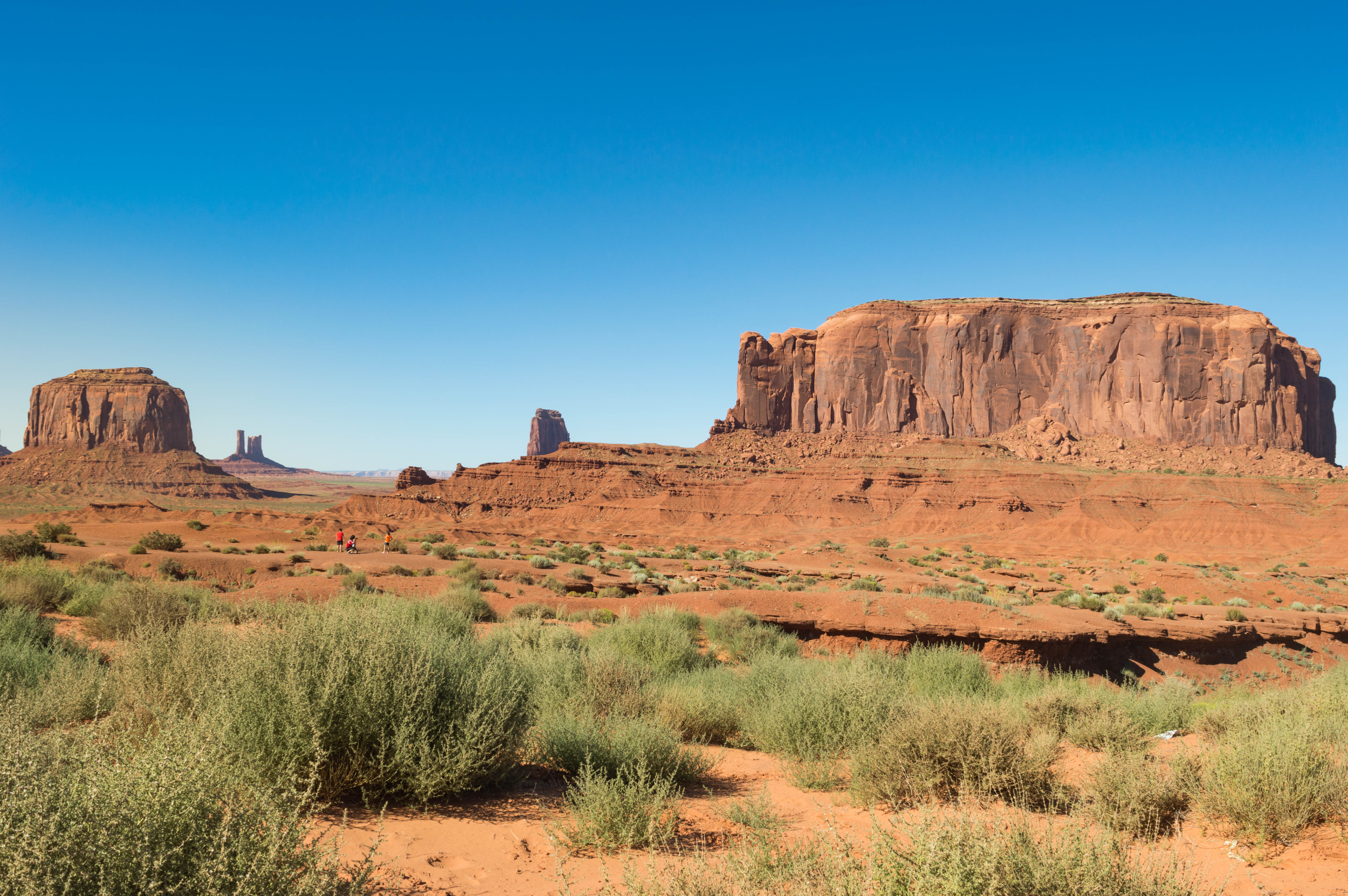
Merrick Butte (left) and Elephant Butte (right)

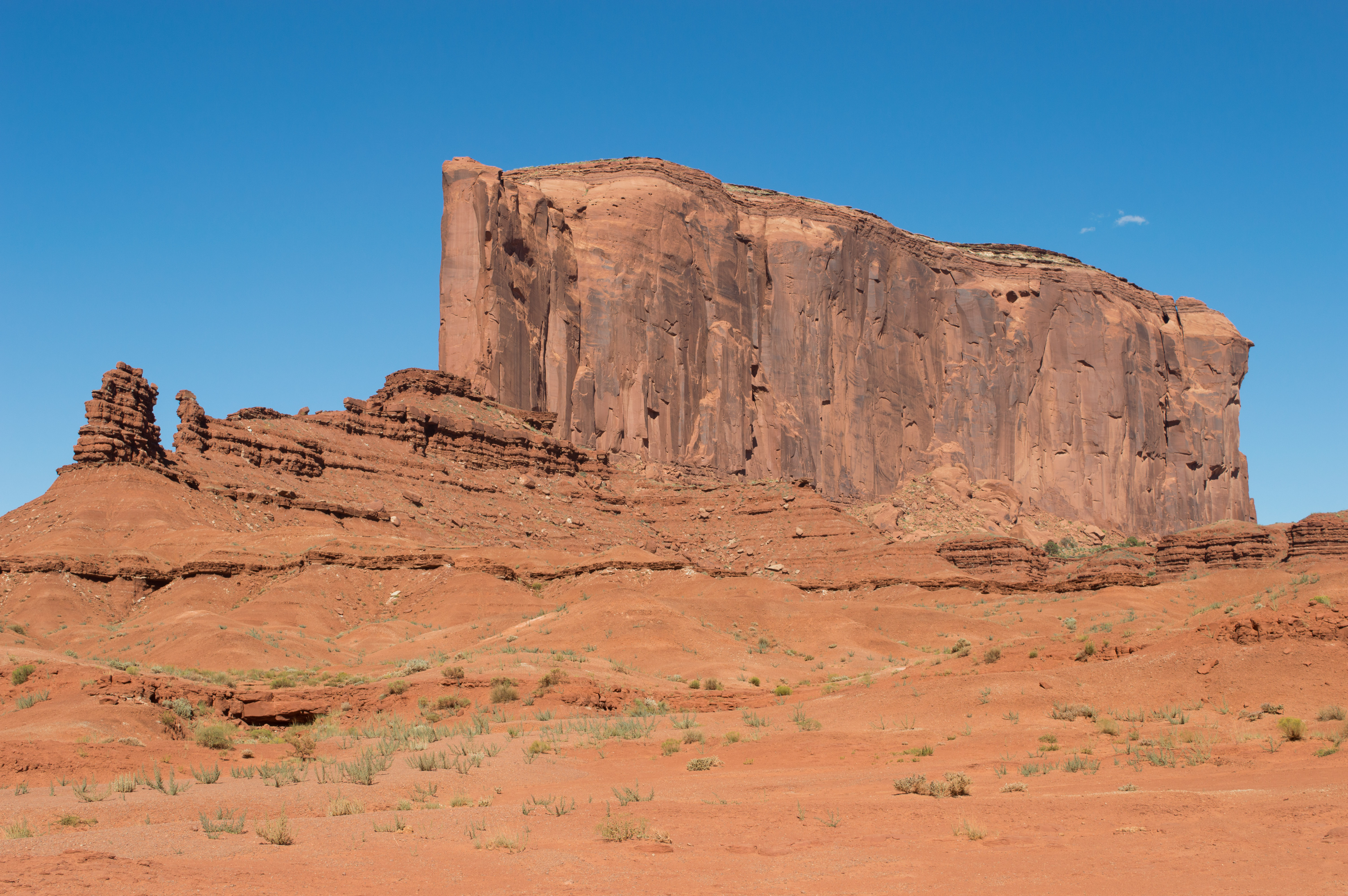
WSW aspect

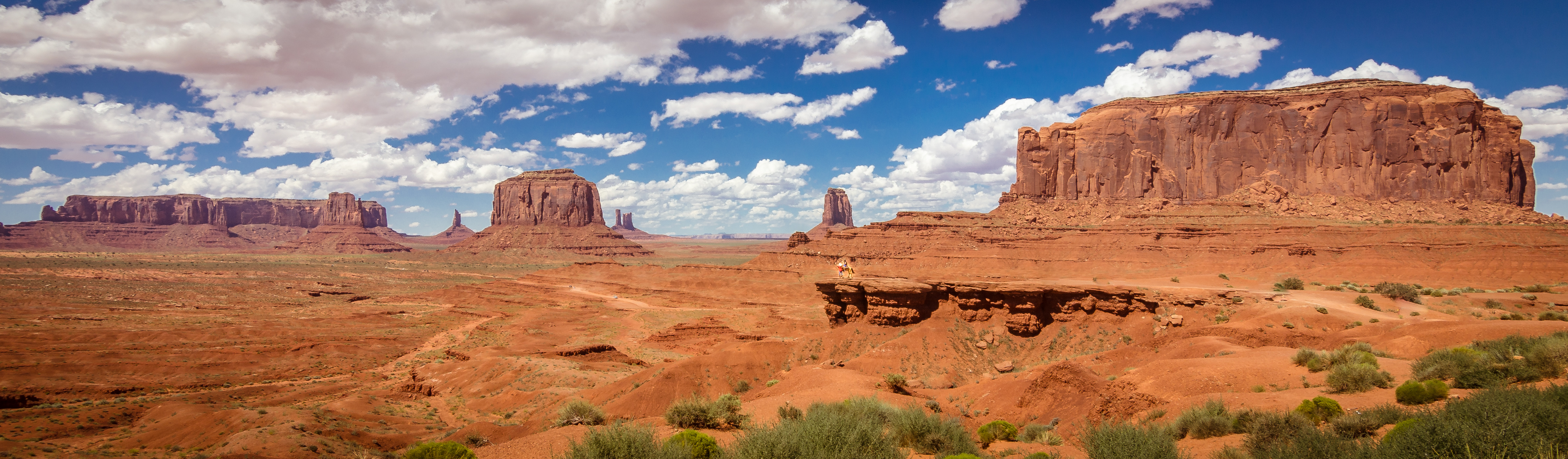
Elephant Butte (right) viewed from John Ford Point

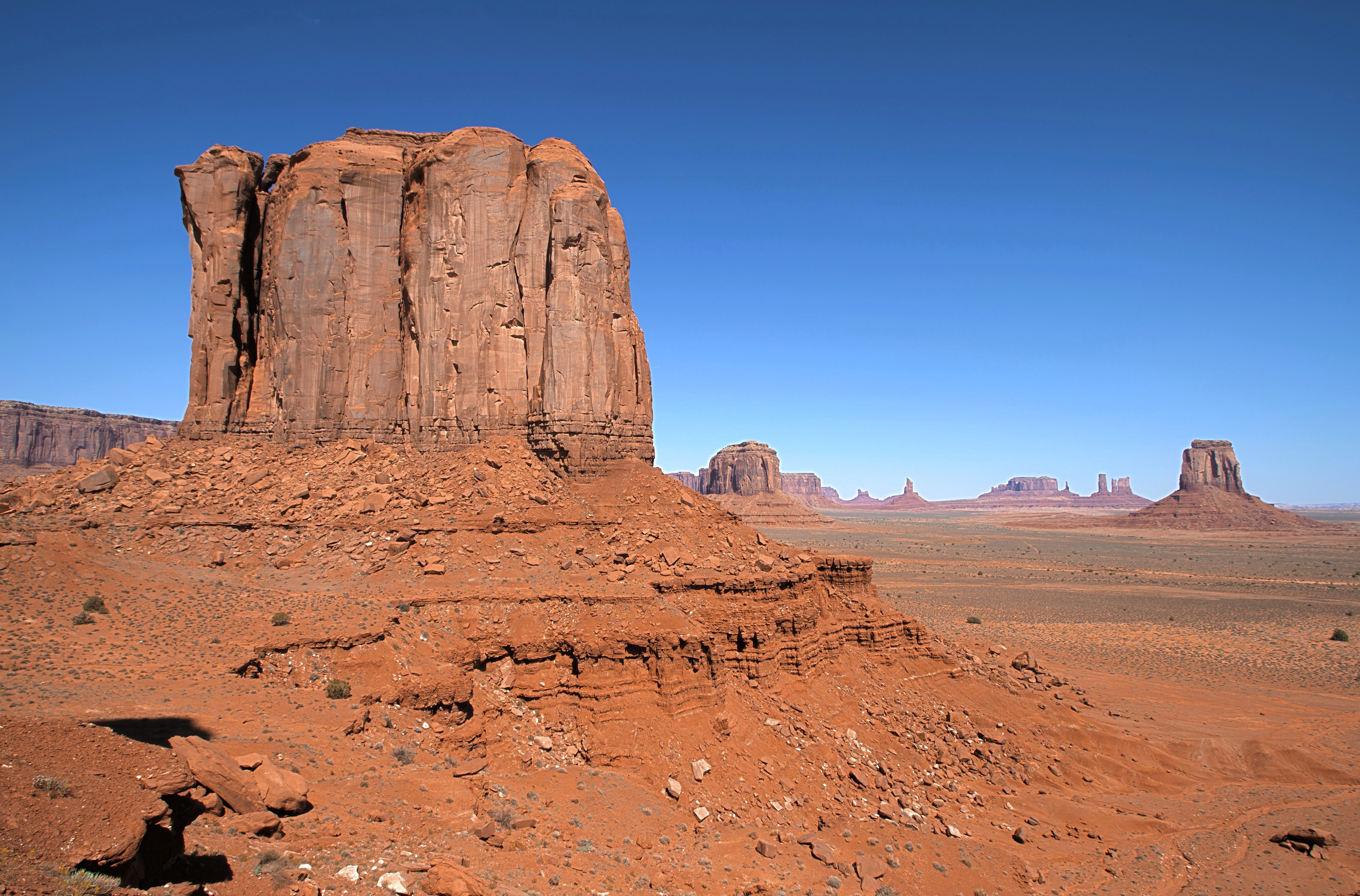
Southeast aspect of Elephant Butte viewed from North Window Overlook

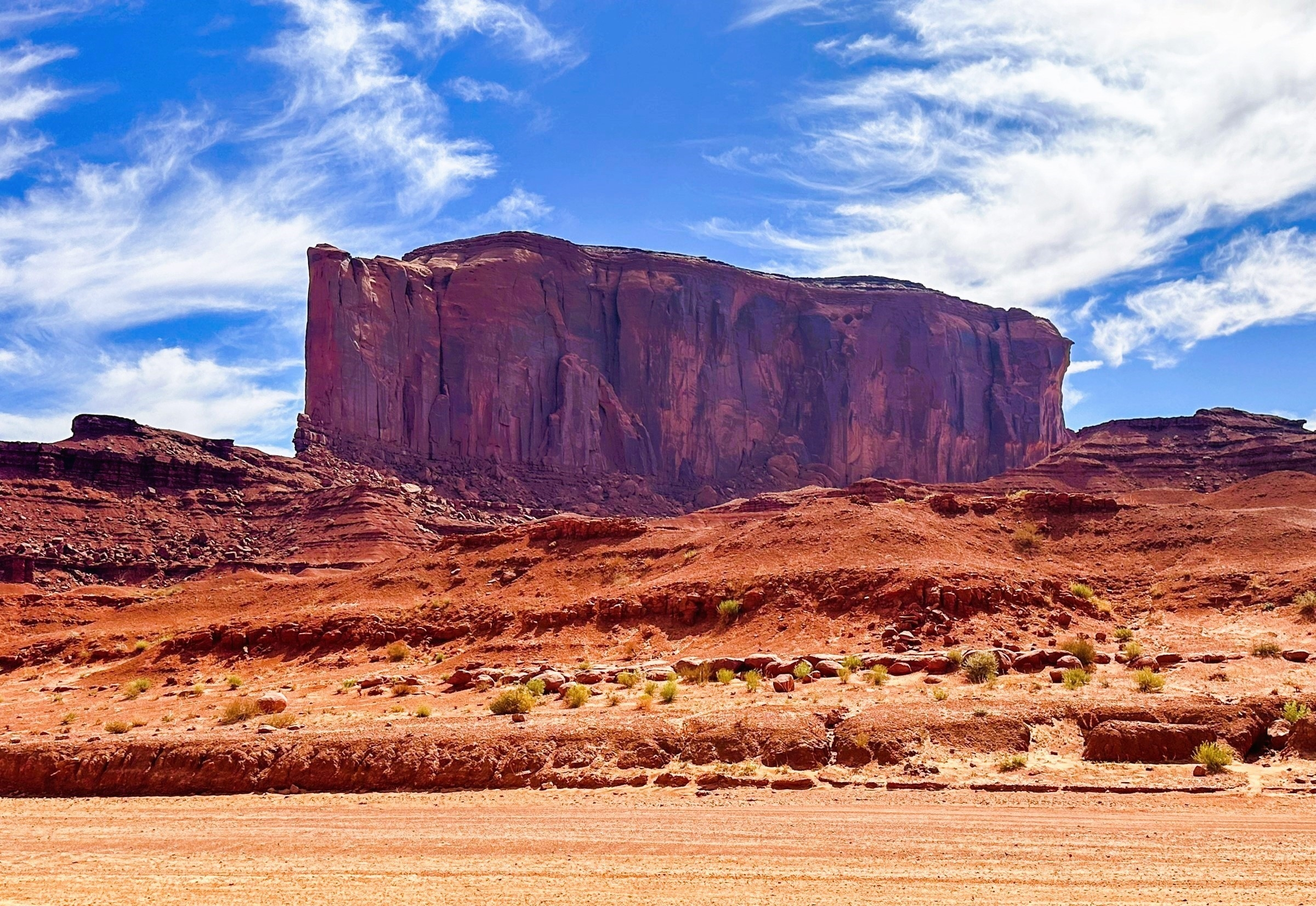
West-southwest aspect Elephant Butte

== See also ==
- List of mountains in Arizona
- List of appearances of Monument Valley in the media
