= Camel Butte =

Mountain in Arizona, United States

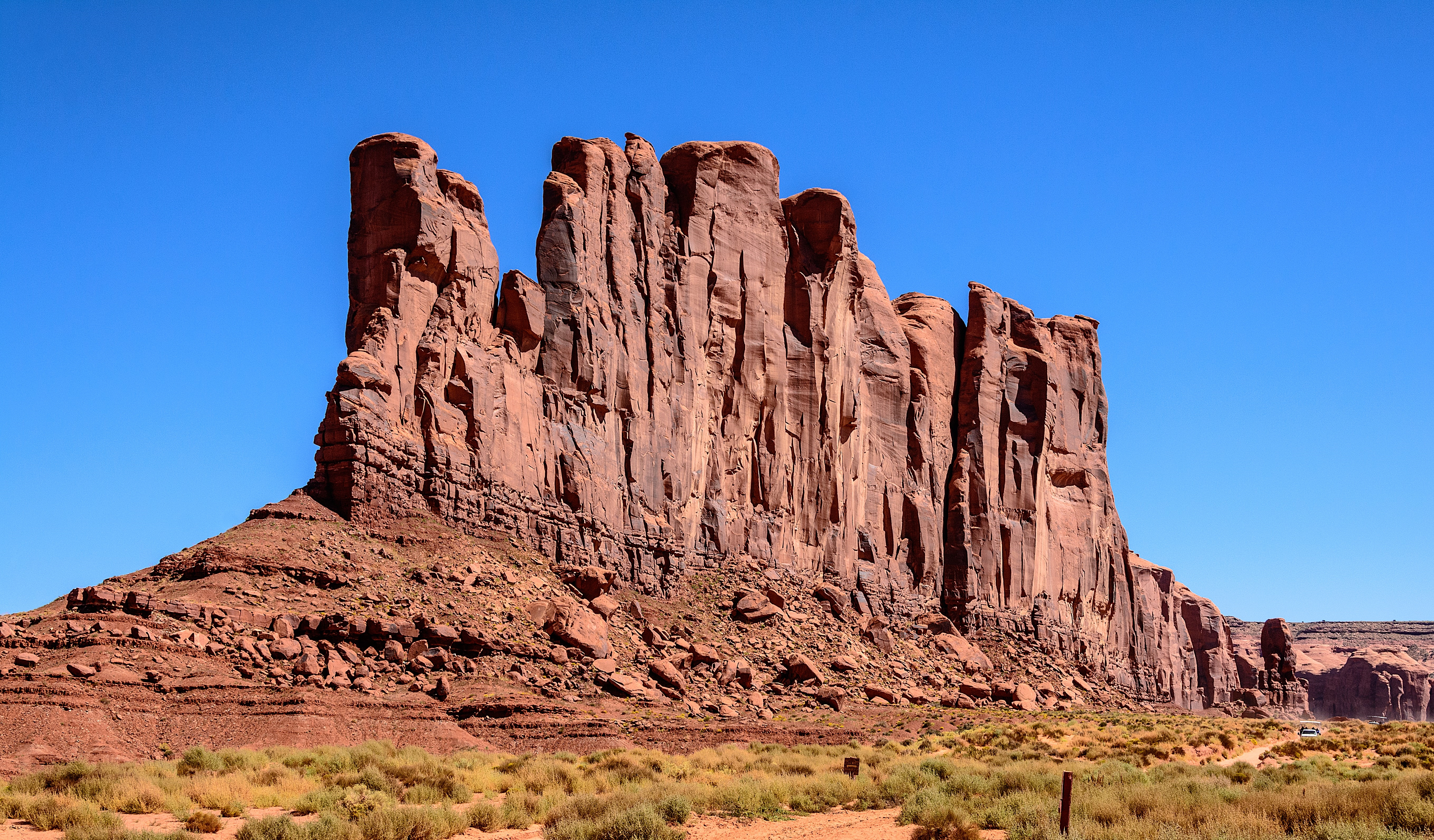
- West aspect

Highest point
- Elevation: 5,847 ft (1,782 m)
- Prominence: 507 ft (155 m)
- Parent peak: Elephant Butte (5,981 ft)
- Isolation: 0.5 mi (0.80 km)
- Coordinates: 36°57′11″N 110°04′41″W

Geography
- Location within Arizona Location within the United States
- Location: Navajo Nation; Navajo County, Arizona, U.S.
- Parent range: Colorado Plateau
- Topo map: USGS Mitten Buttes

Geology
- Rock age: Permian
- Mountain type: Butte
- Rock type: Sandstone

Camel Butte is a 5,847-foot-elevation (1,782-meter) summit in Navajo County, Arizona, United States.

== Description ==
Camel Butte is situated 2.75 miles (4.43 km) southeast of the Monument Valley visitor center on Navajo Nation land. Precipitation runoff from this butte's slopes drains into Gypsum Creek which is a tributary of the San Juan River. Topographic relief is significant as the summit rises 550 feet (168 meters) above the surrounding terrain in 0.1 mile (0.16 km). The nearest higher neighbor is Elephant Butte, 0.5 miles (0.80 km) to the north. The landform's toponym has been officially adopted by the U.S. Board on Geographic Names, and the descriptive name refers to the resemblance of a camel sitting and facing west.

== Geology ==
Camel Butte is a butte composed of two principal strata. The bottom layer is slope-forming Organ Rock Shale and the upper stratum is cliff-forming De Chelly Sandstone. The rock was deposited during the Permian period. The buttes and mesas of Monument Valley are the result of the Organ Rock Shale being more easily eroded than the overlaying sandstone.

== Climate ==
Spring and fall are the most favorable seasons to visit Camel Butte. According to the Köppen climate classification system, it is located in a semi-arid climate zone with cold winters and hot summers. Summers average 54 days above 90 °F (32 °C) annually, and highs rarely exceed 100 °F (38 °C). Summer nights are comfortably cool, and temperatures drop quickly after sunset. Winters are cold, but daytime highs are usually above freezing. Winter temperatures below 0 °F (−18 °C) are uncommon, though possible. This desert climate receives less than 10 inches (250 millimeters) of annual rainfall, and snowfall is generally light during the winter.

== See also ==
- List of appearances of Monument Valley in the media

== Gallery ==
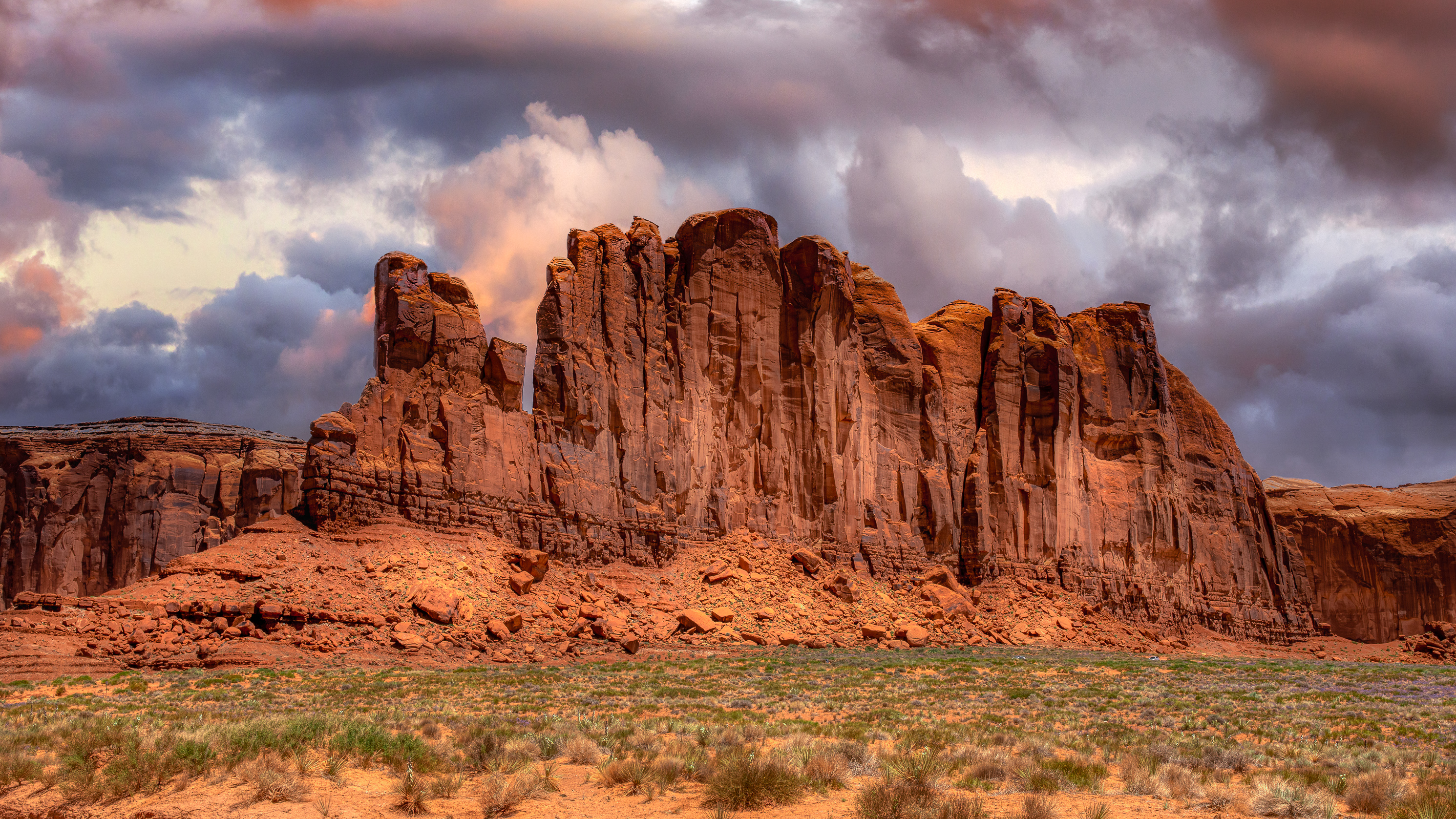
Southwest aspect

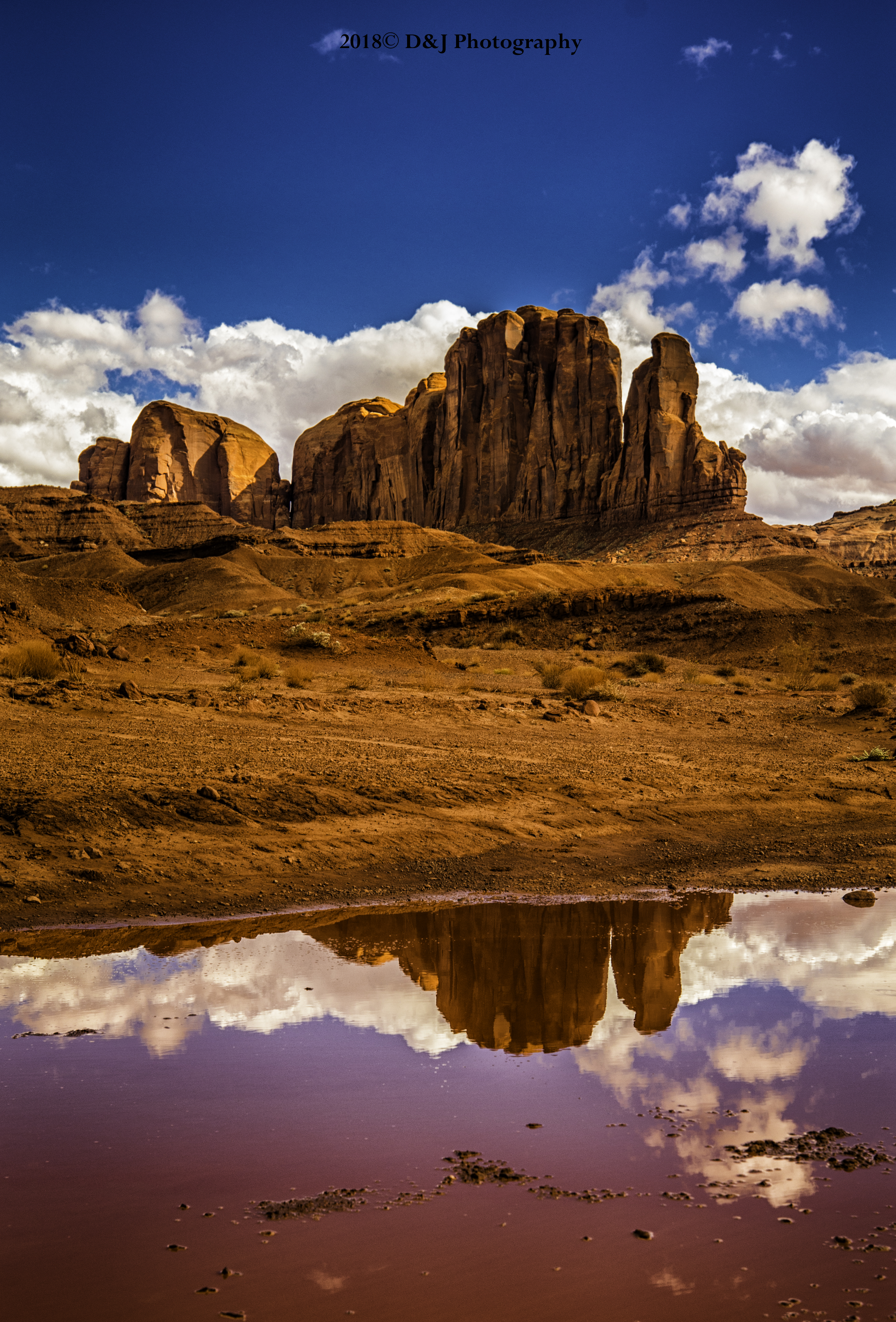
Northwest aspect

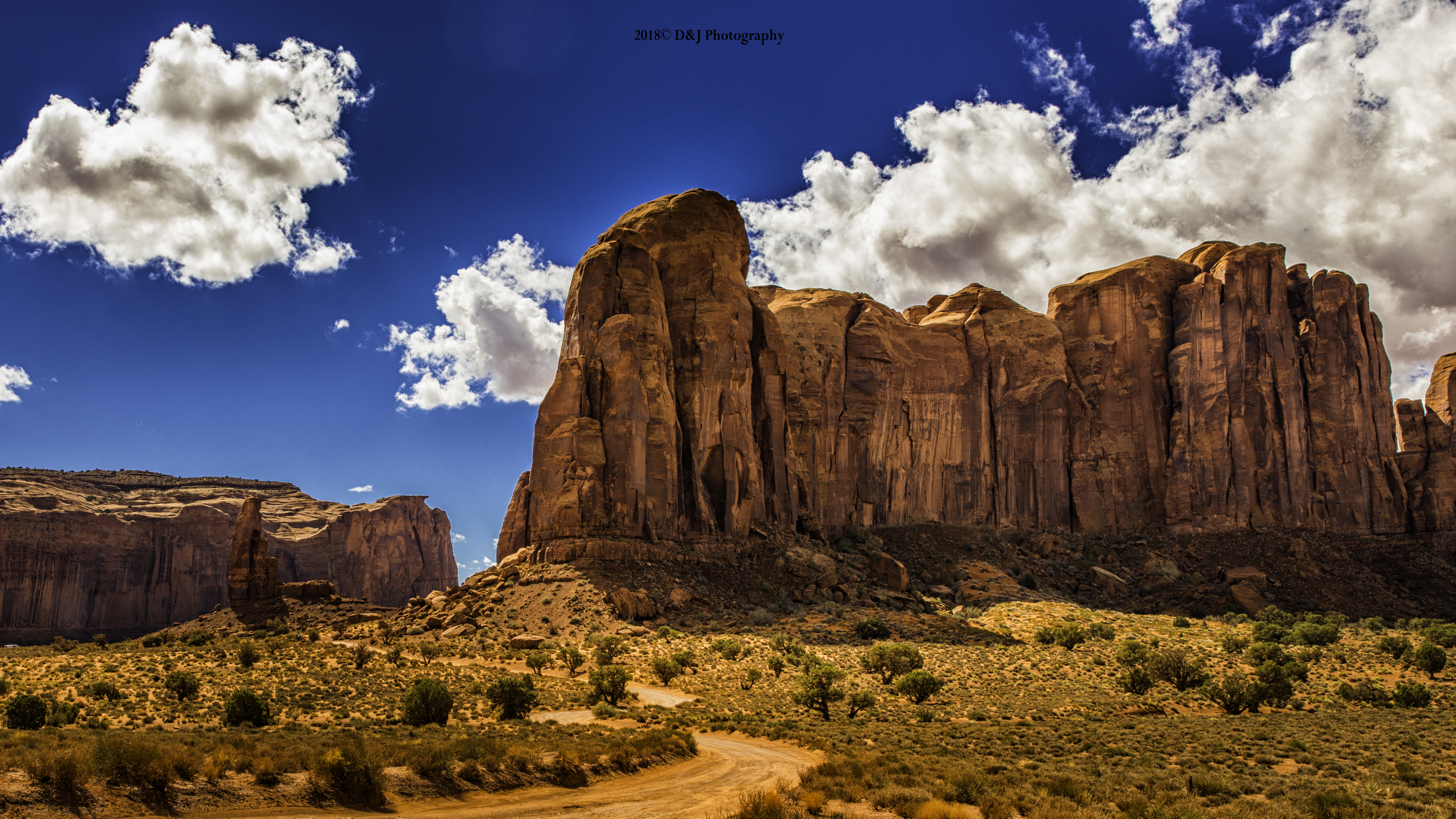
Northeast aspect

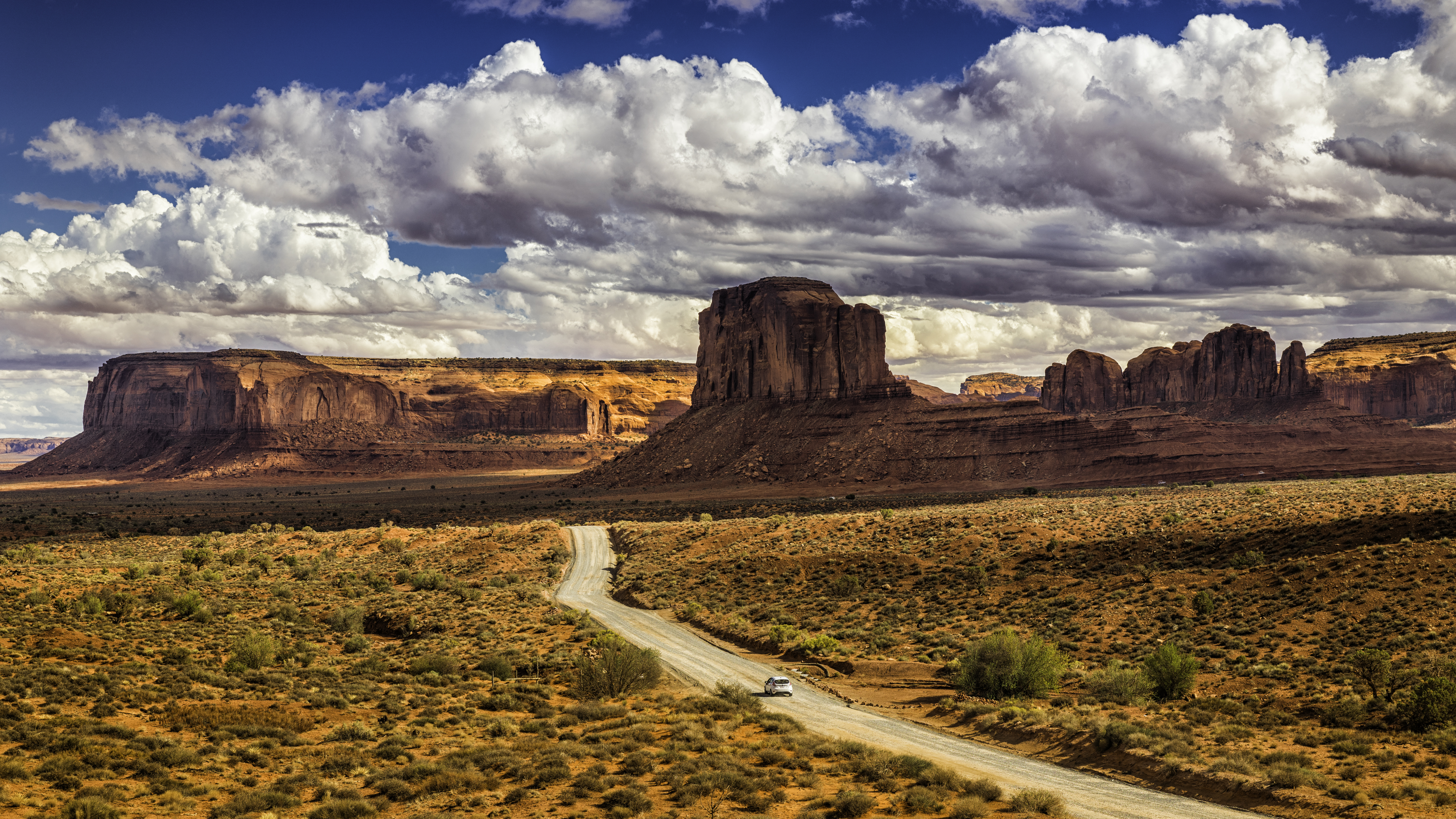
Spearhead Mesa (left), Elephant Butte (center), Camel Butte (right)

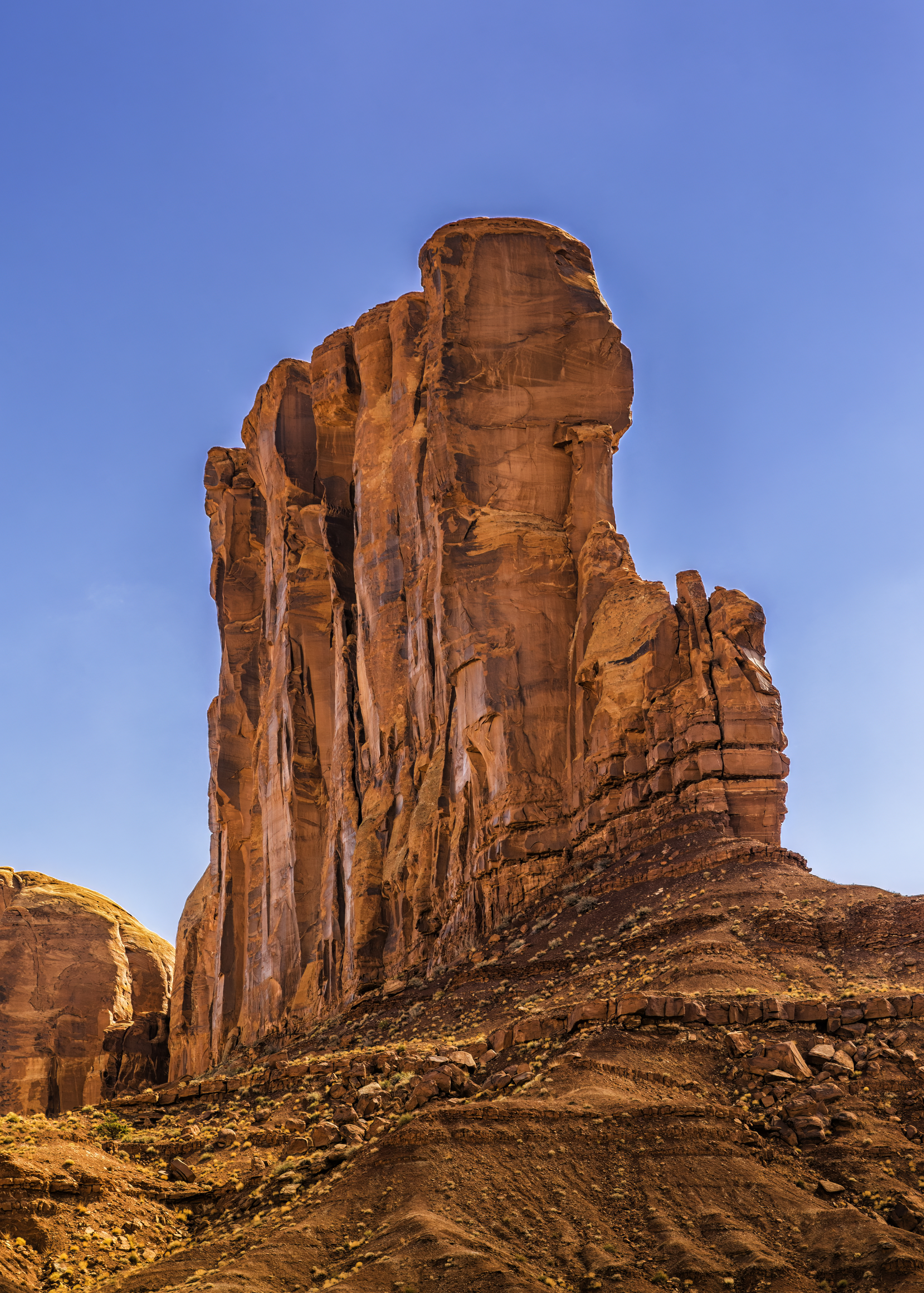
West aspect

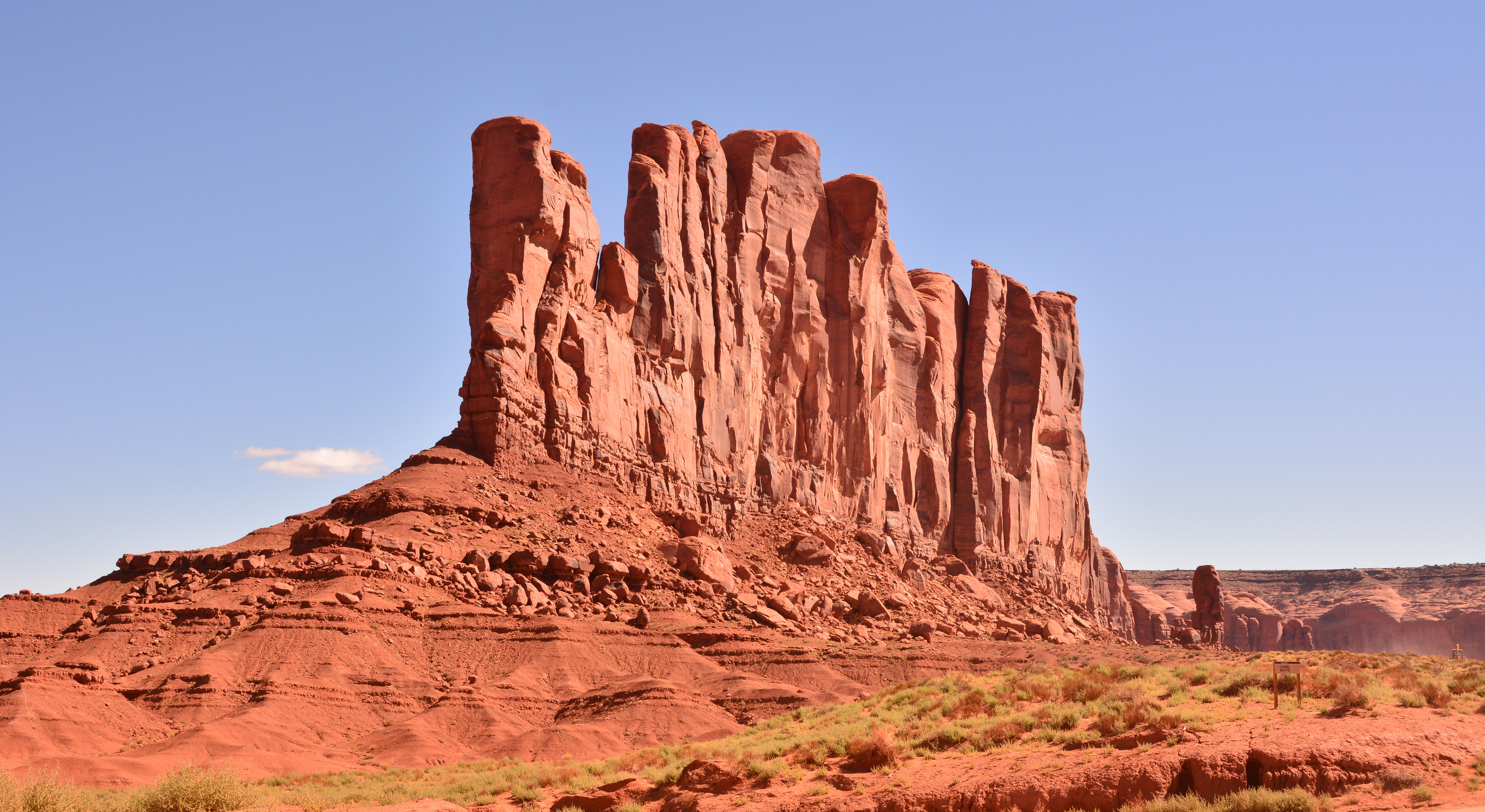
Southwest aspect

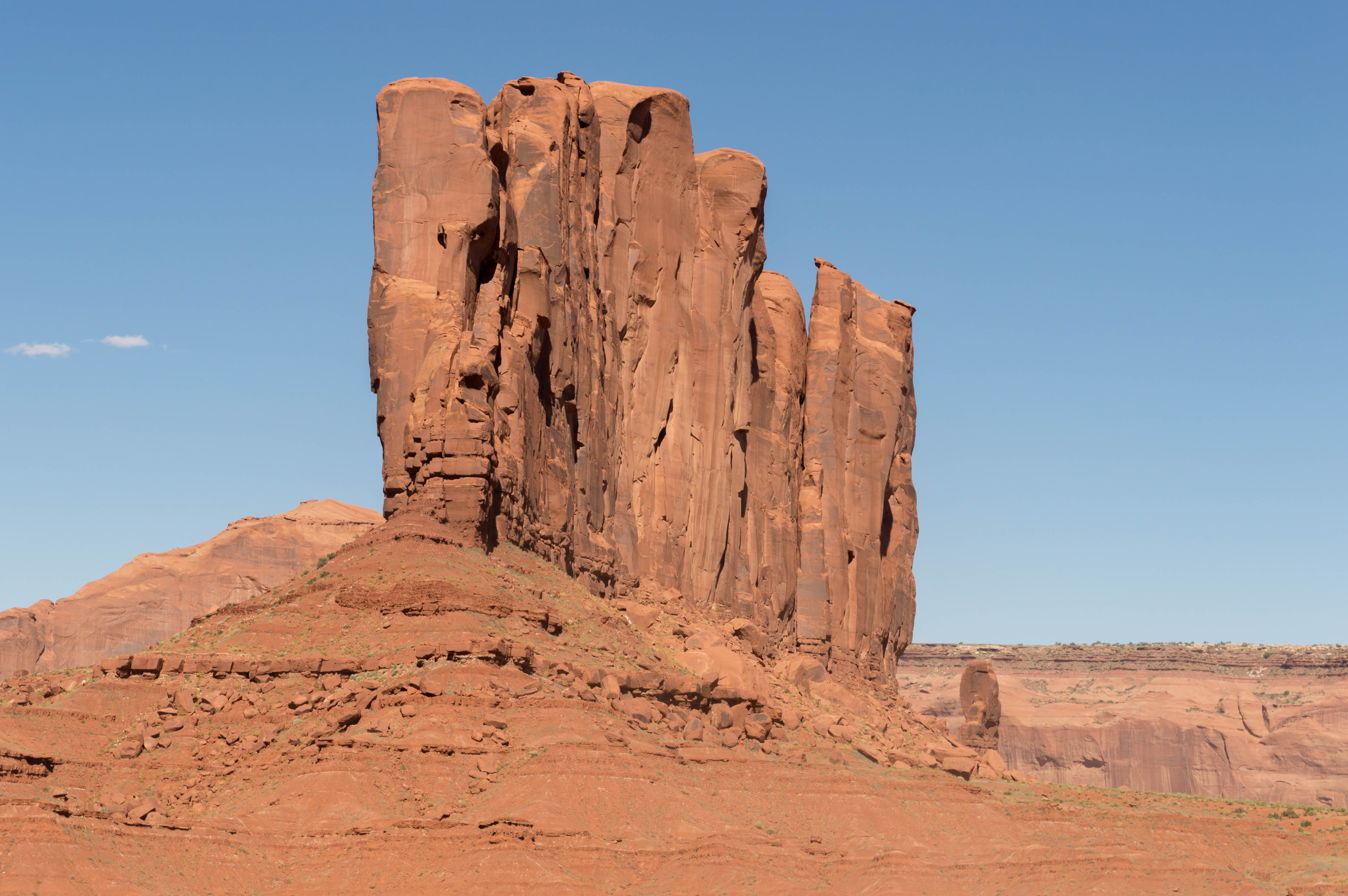
West aspect

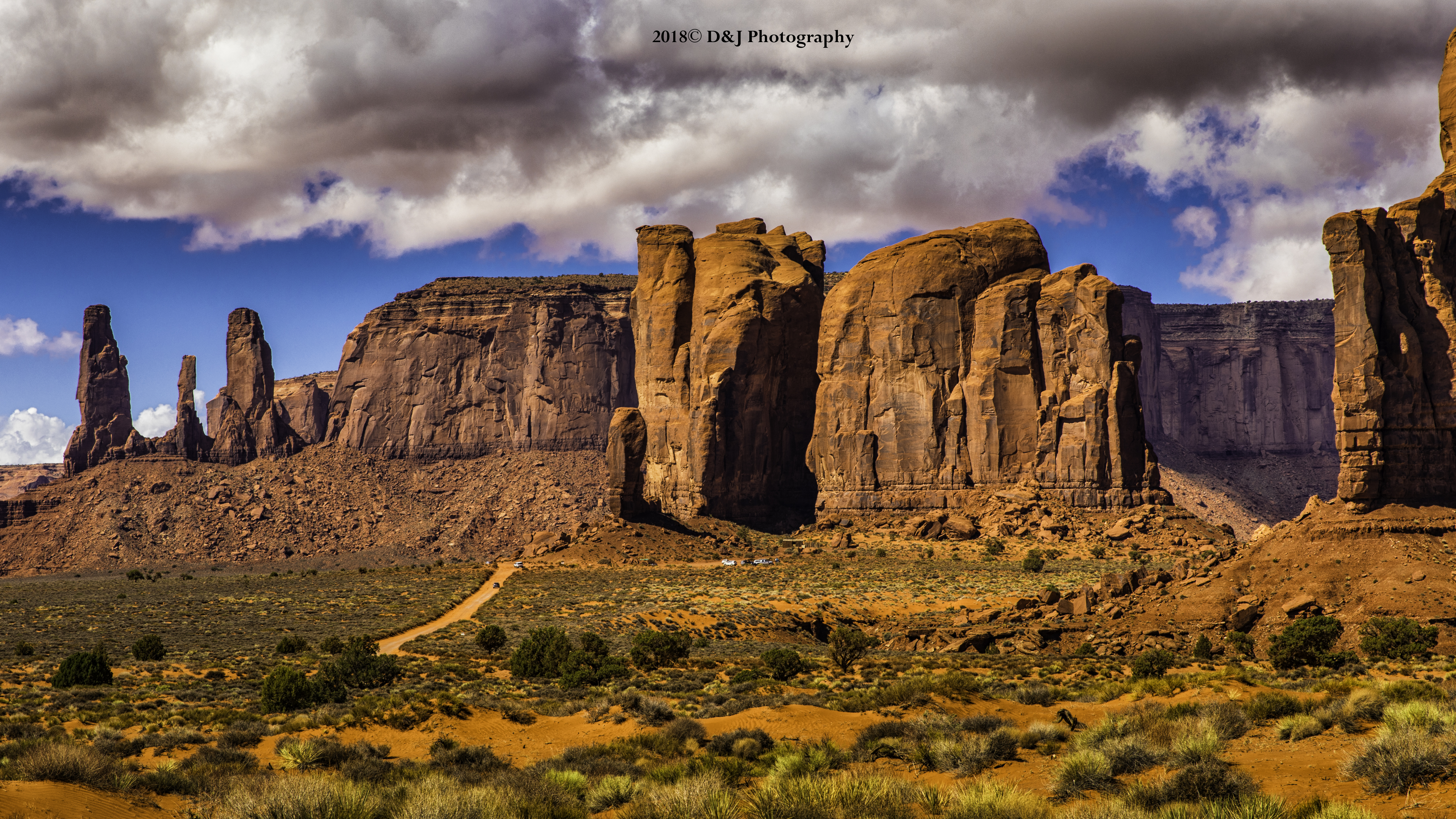
East aspect of Camel Butte centered, with Mitchell Mesa behind and Three Sisters to left.

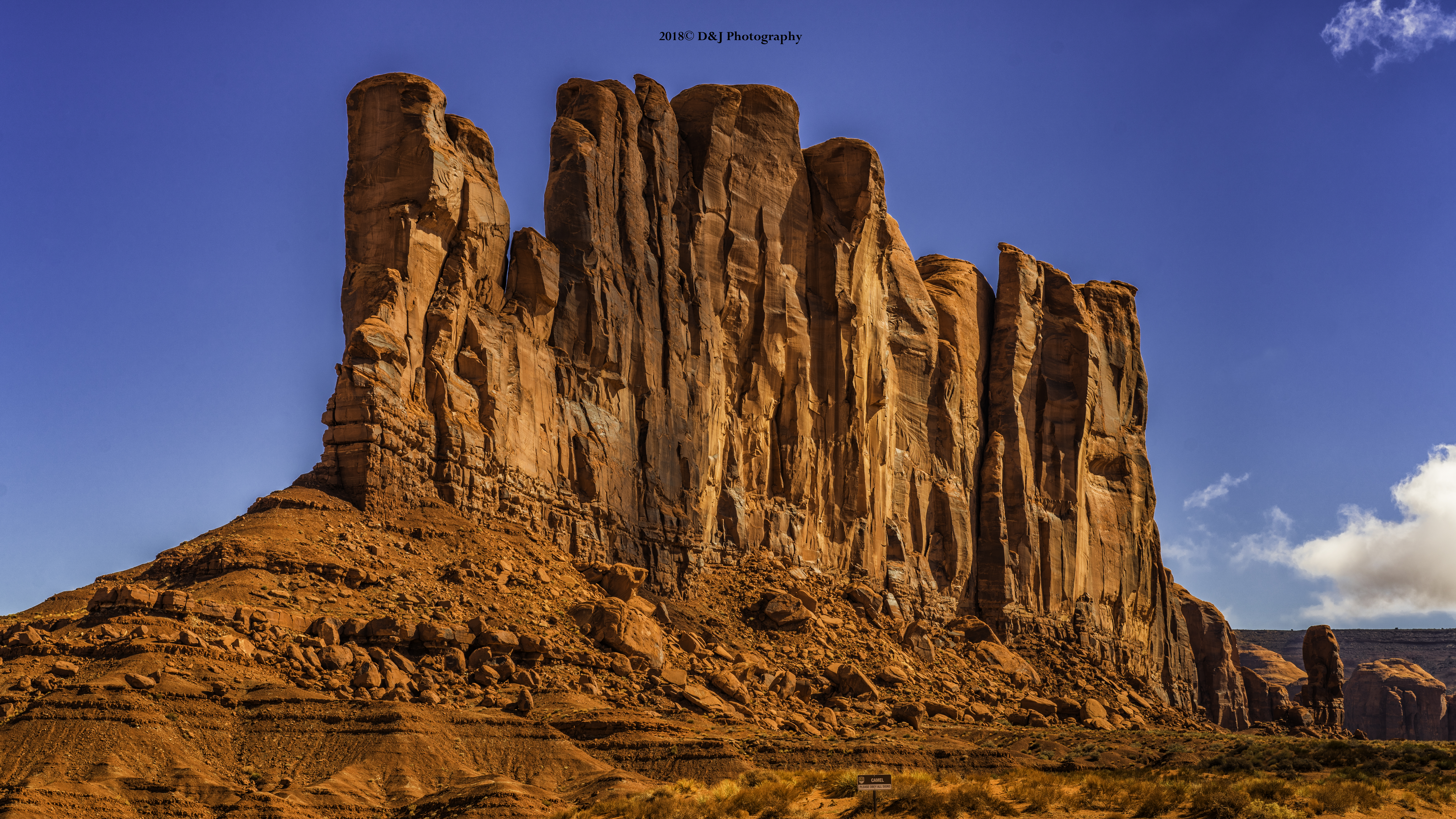
West aspect
