= Spearhead Mesa =

Mesa in Navajo County, Arizona, United States

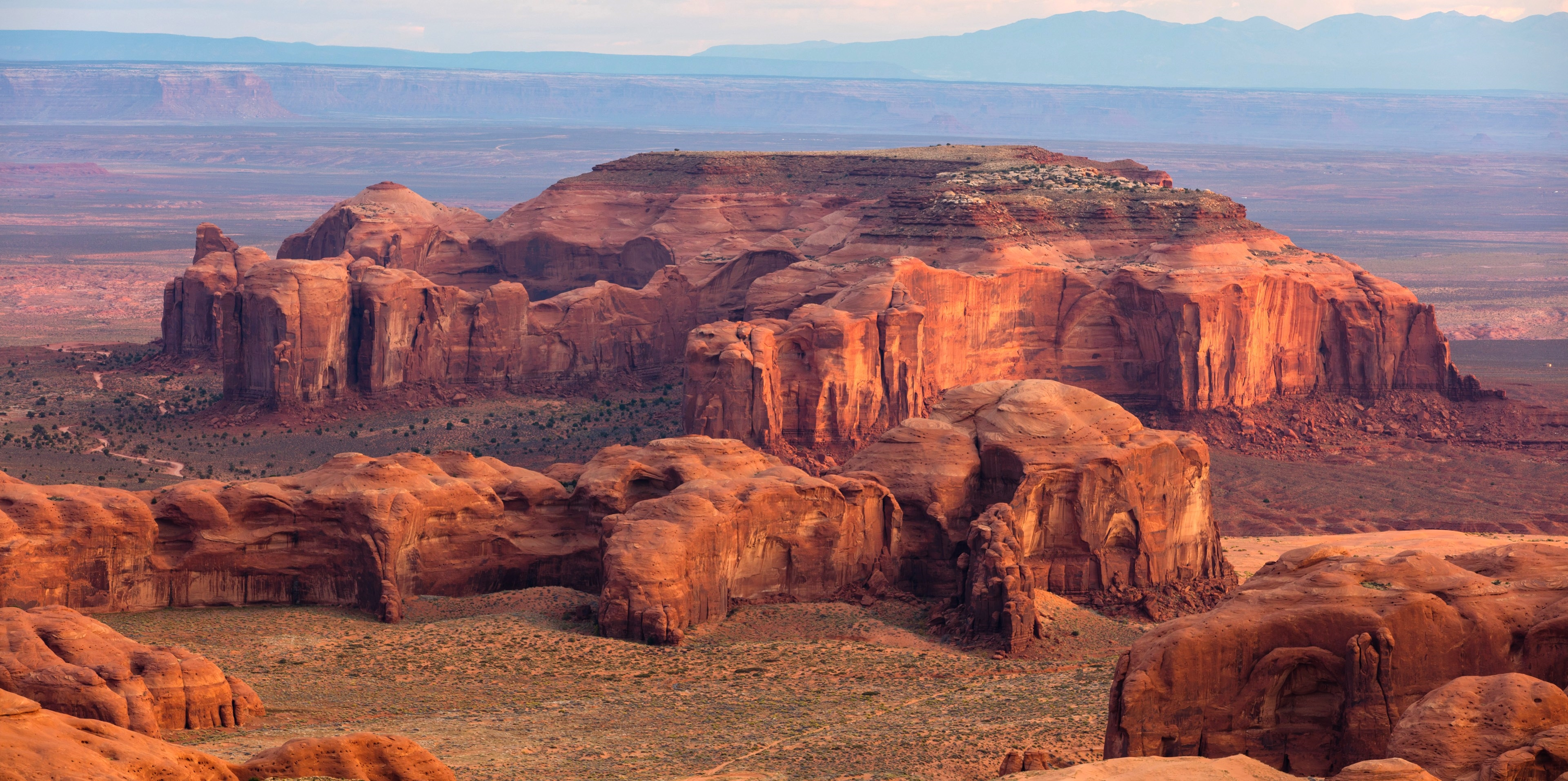
- South aspect

Highest point
- Elevation: 5,998 ft (1,828 m)
- Prominence: 738 ft (225 m)
- Parent peak: Mitchell Mesa (6,586 ft)
- Isolation: 2.50 mi (4.02 km)
- Coordinates: 36°56′49″N 110°03′06″W

Geography
- Location within Arizona Location within the United States
- Location: Navajo Reservation; Navajo County, Arizona, U.S.
- Parent range: Colorado Plateau
- Topo map: USGS Mitten Buttes

Geology
- Mountain type: Mesa
- Rock type: Sandstone

Spearhead Mesa is a 5,998-foot-elevation (1,828-meter) summit in Navajo County, Arizona, United States.

== Description ==
Spearhead Mesa is situated four miles (6.4 km) southeast of the Monument Valley visitor center on Navajo Nation land. The nearest higher neighbor is the iconic East Mitten Butte, 2.5 miles (4.0 km) to the north-northwest. Precipitation runoff from this mesa's slopes drains into Gypsum Creek which is a tributary of the San Juan River. Topographic relief is significant as the summit rises 900 feet (274 meters) above the surrounding terrain in one-quarter mile (0.4 km). The landform's toponym has been officially adopted by the U.S. Board on Geographic Names. The spearhead name refers to a sandstone spire above Artist Point that resembles the spear of an arrow.

== Geology ==
Spearhead Mesa is a mesa composed of three principal strata. The bottom layer is slope-forming Organ Rock Shale, the next stratum is cliff-forming De Chelly Sandstone, and the upper layer is Moenkopi Formation with a Shinarump Conglomerate caprock. The rock ranges in age from Permian at the bottom to Late Triassic at the top. The buttes and mesas of Monument Valley are the result of the Organ Rock Shale being more easily eroded than the overlaying sandstone.

== Climate ==
Spring and fall are the most favorable seasons to visit Spearhead Mesa. According to the Köppen climate classification system, it is located in a semi-arid climate zone with cold winters and hot summers. Summers average 54 days above 90 °F (32 °C) annually, and highs rarely exceed 100 °F (38 °C). Summer nights are comfortably cool, and temperatures drop quickly after sunset. Winters are cold, but daytime highs are usually above freezing. Winter temperatures below 0 °F (−18 °C) are uncommon, though possible. This desert climate receives less than 10 inches (250 millimeters) of annual rainfall, and snowfall is generally light during the winter.

== Gallery ==
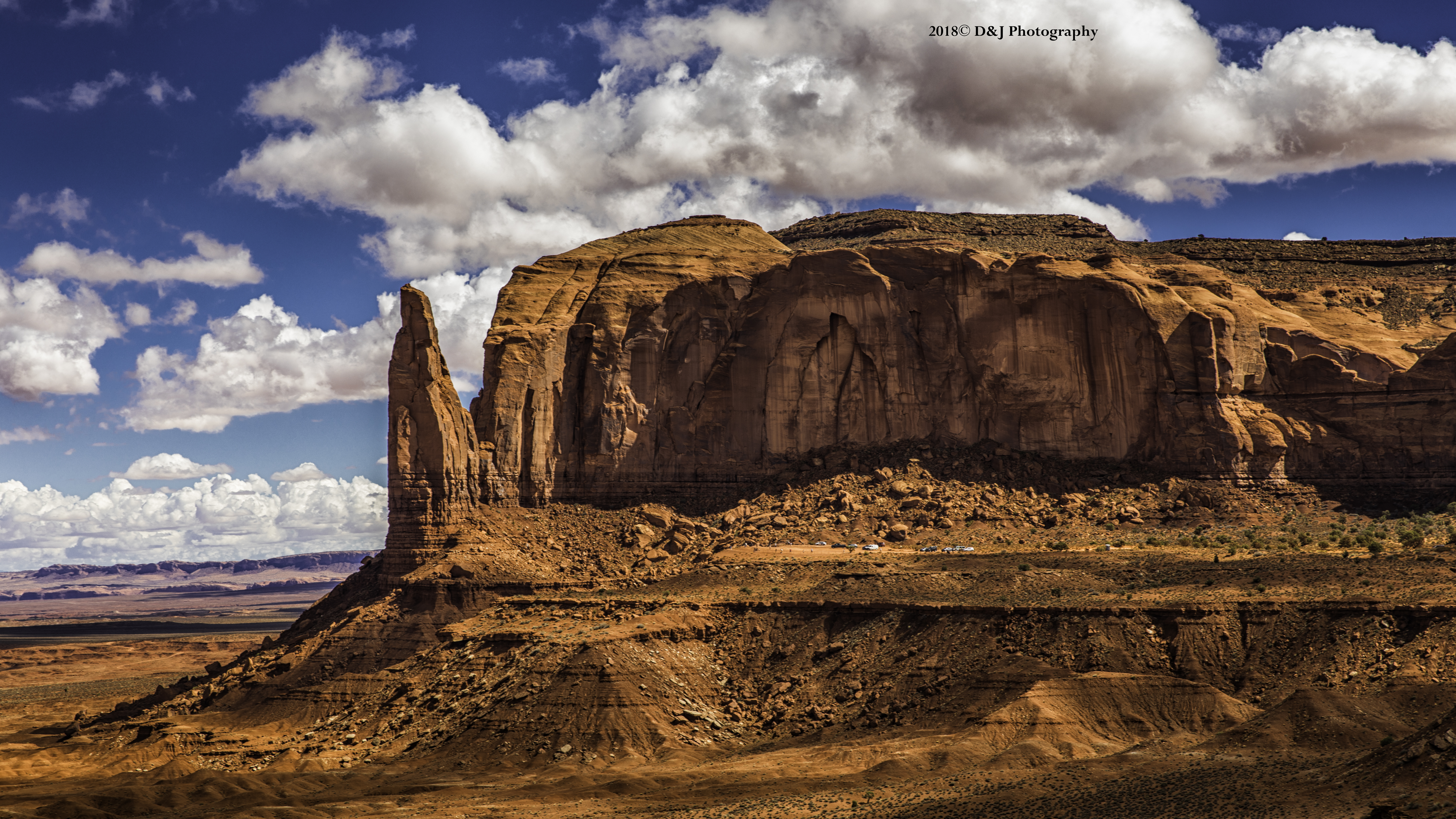
West aspect, cars visible at Artist Point. Note the spearhead-shape spire to the left which imparts the name to the mesa.

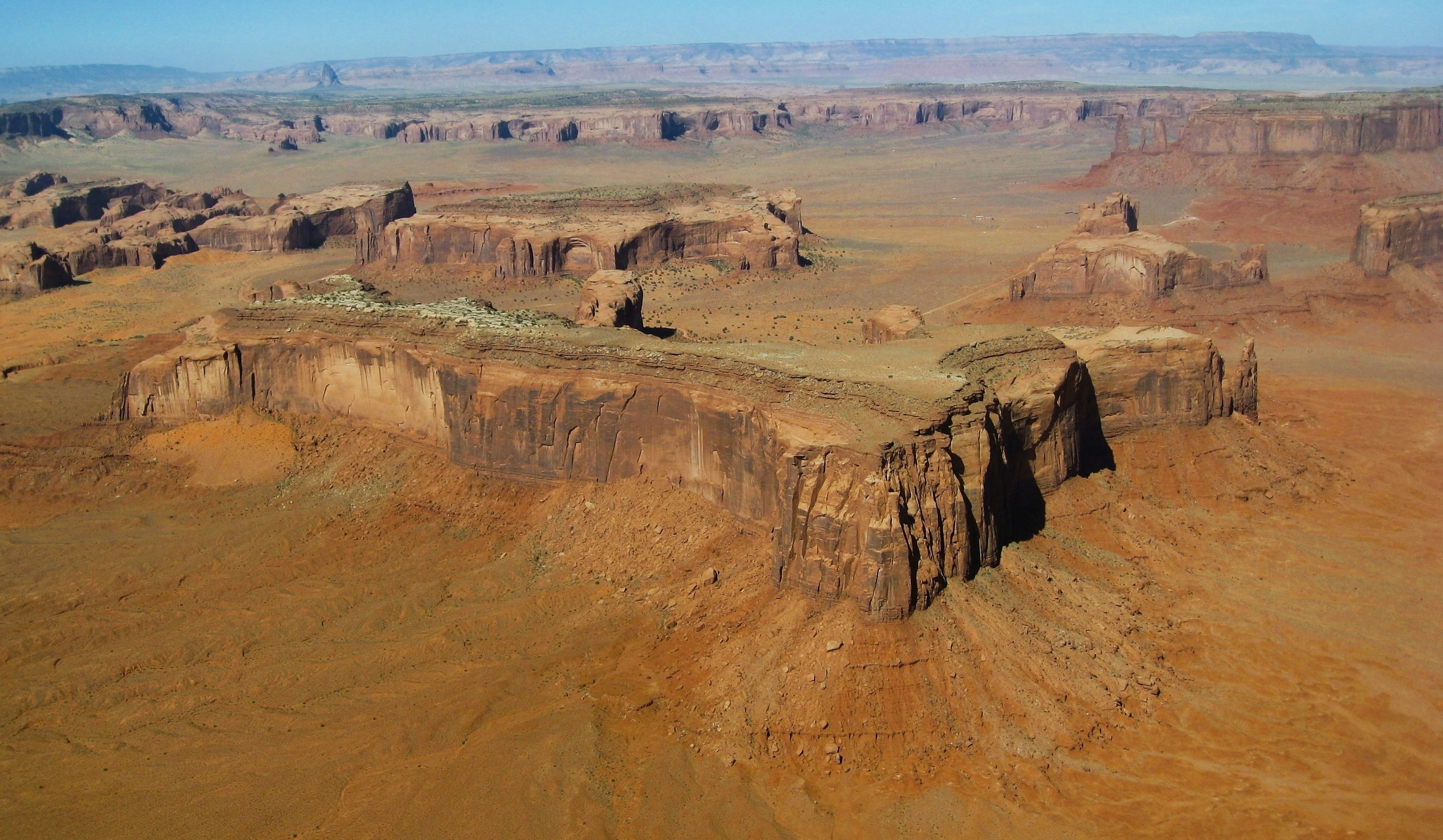
Northeast aspect, aerial view

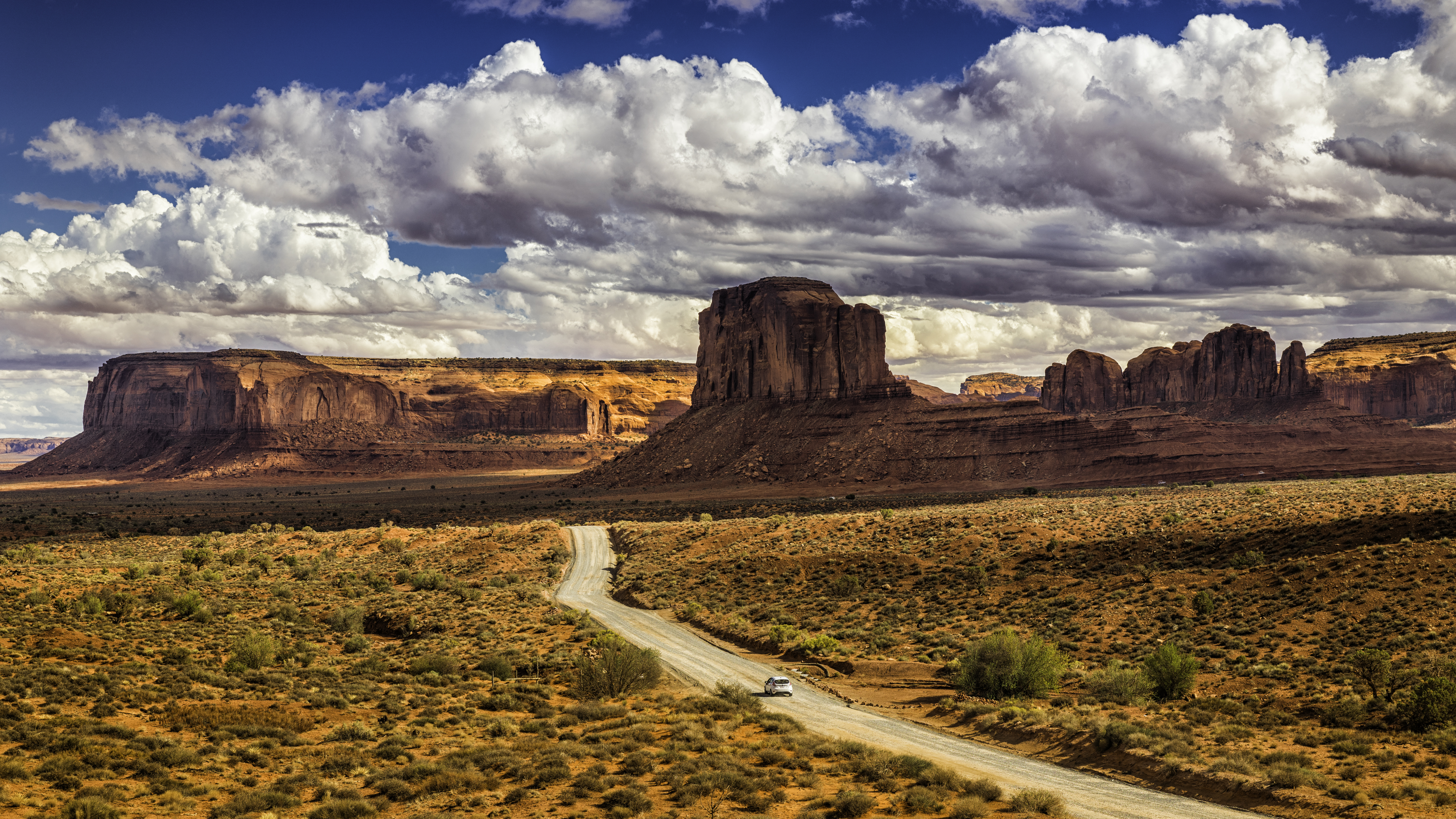
Spearhead Mesa to left with Elephant Butte centered

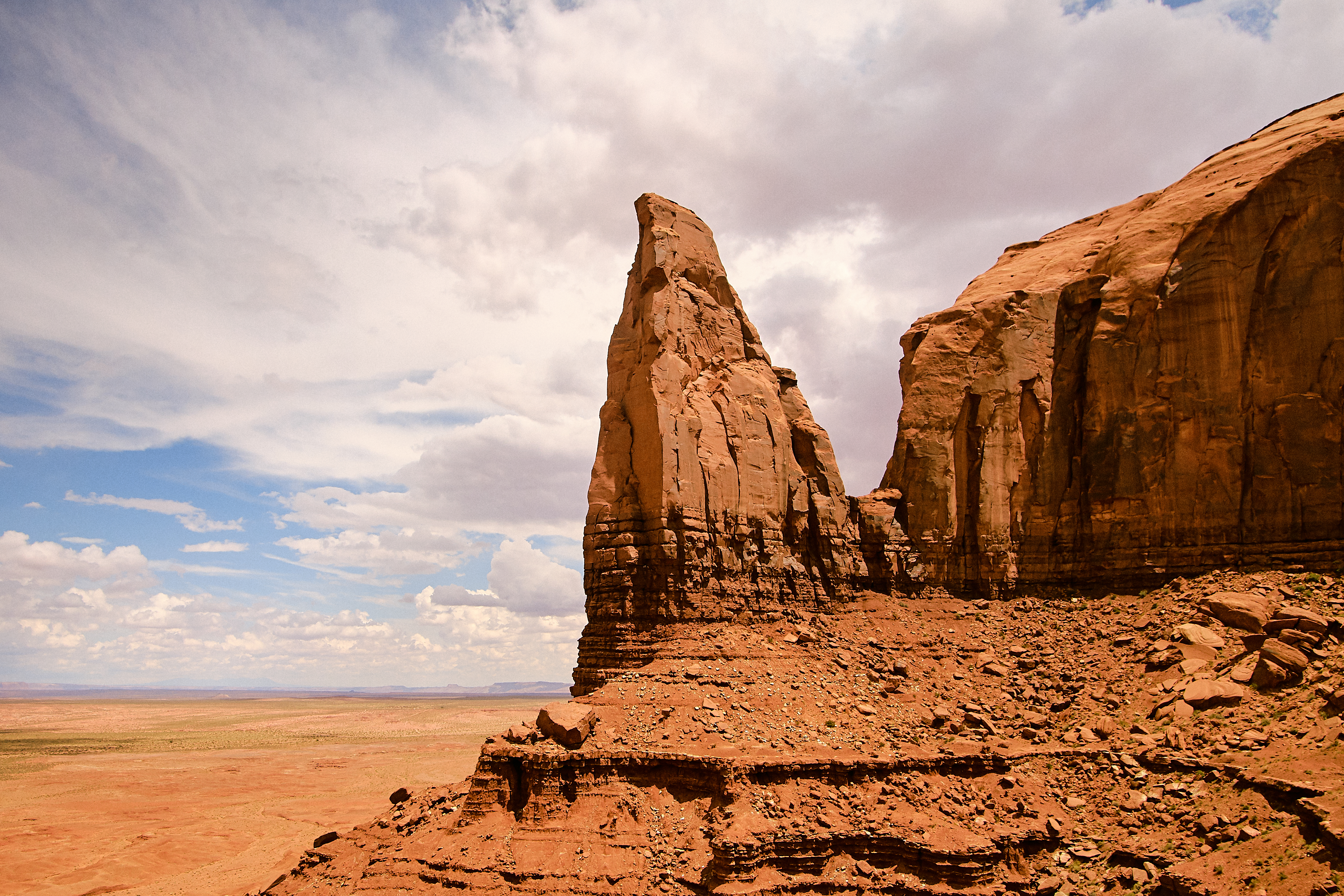
The "Spearhead" seen from Artist Point

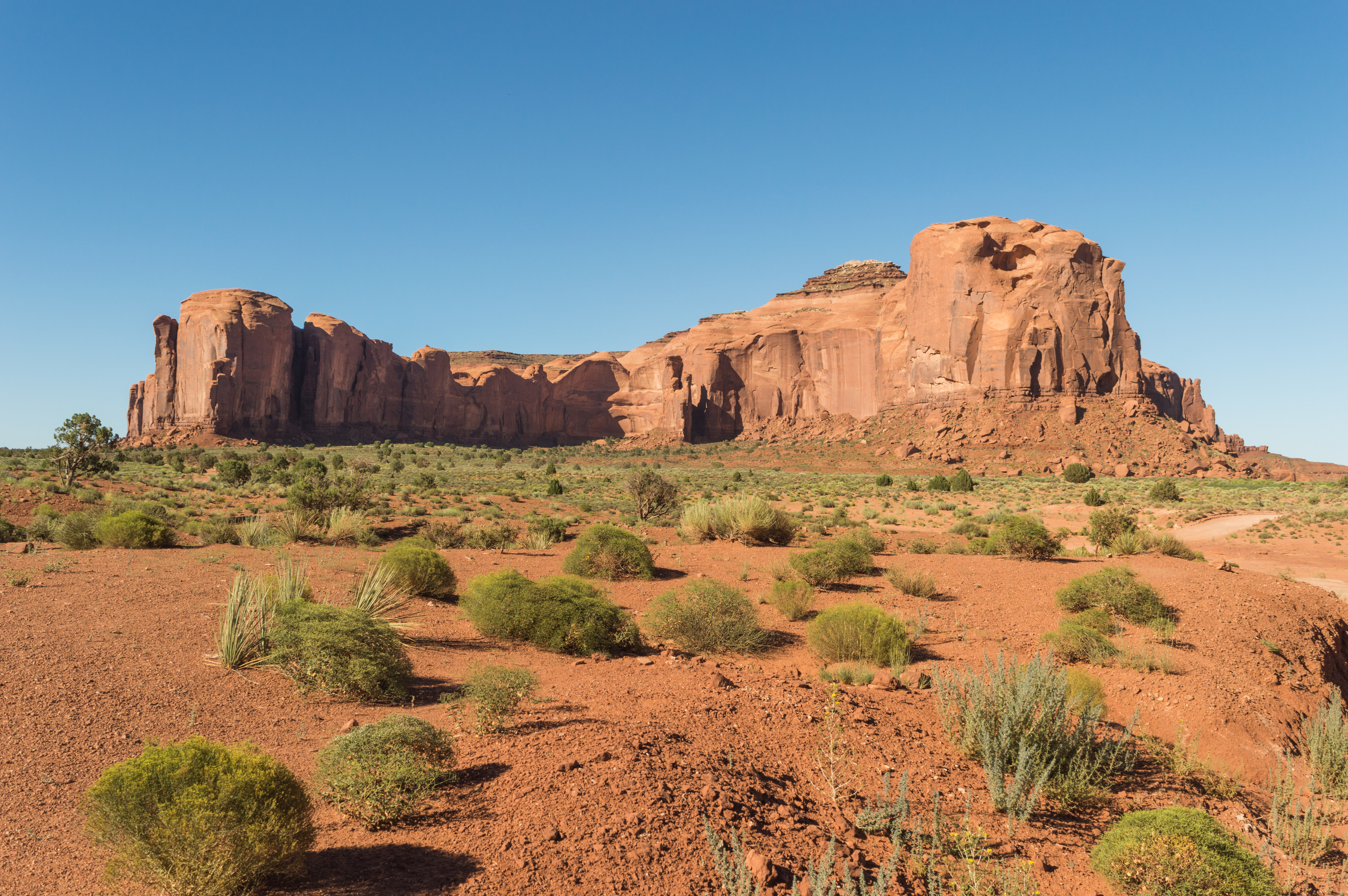
Southwest aspect of Spearhead Mesa

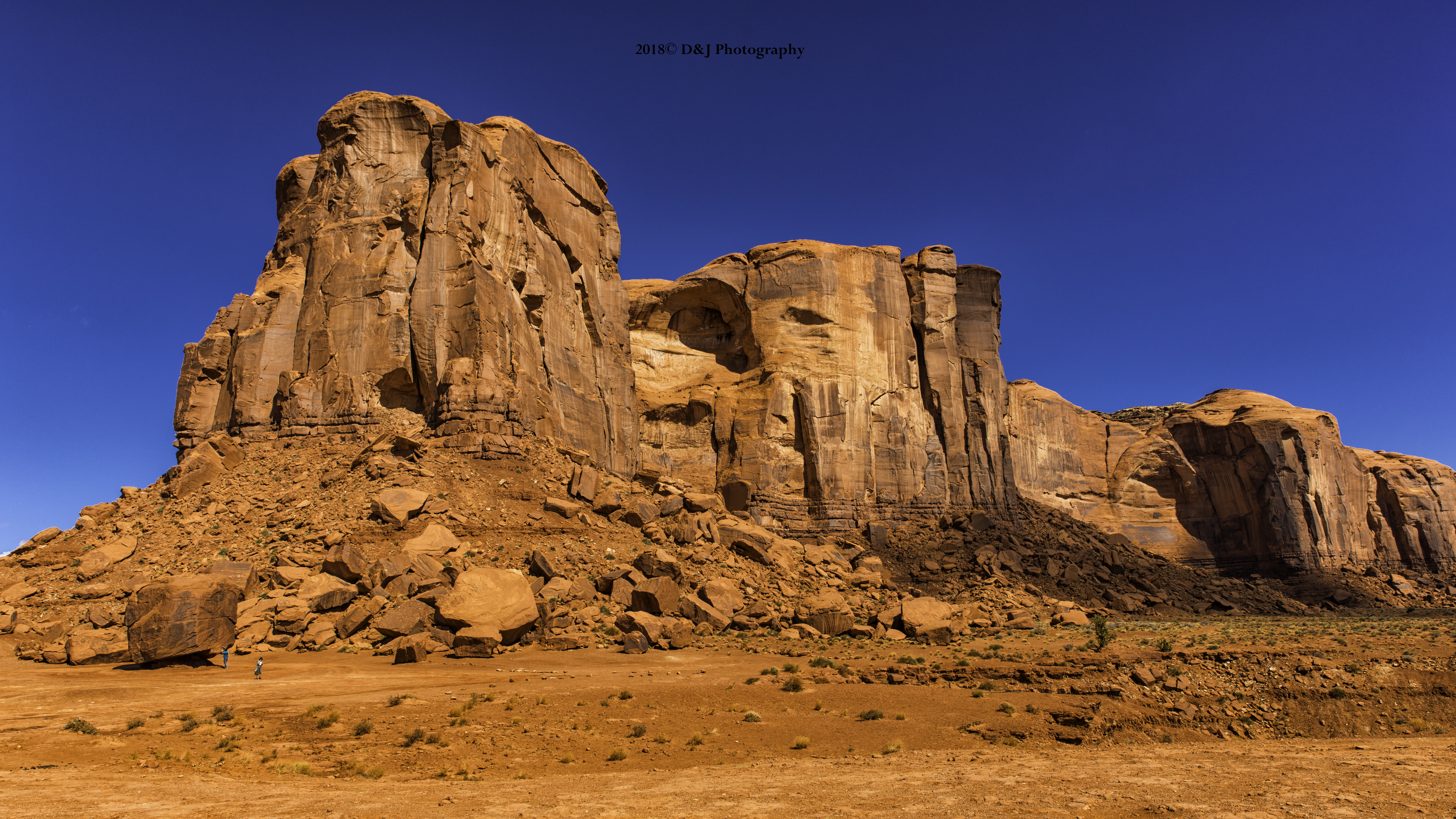
Southern tip of Spearhead Mesa. "The Cube" is the large boulder at lower left.

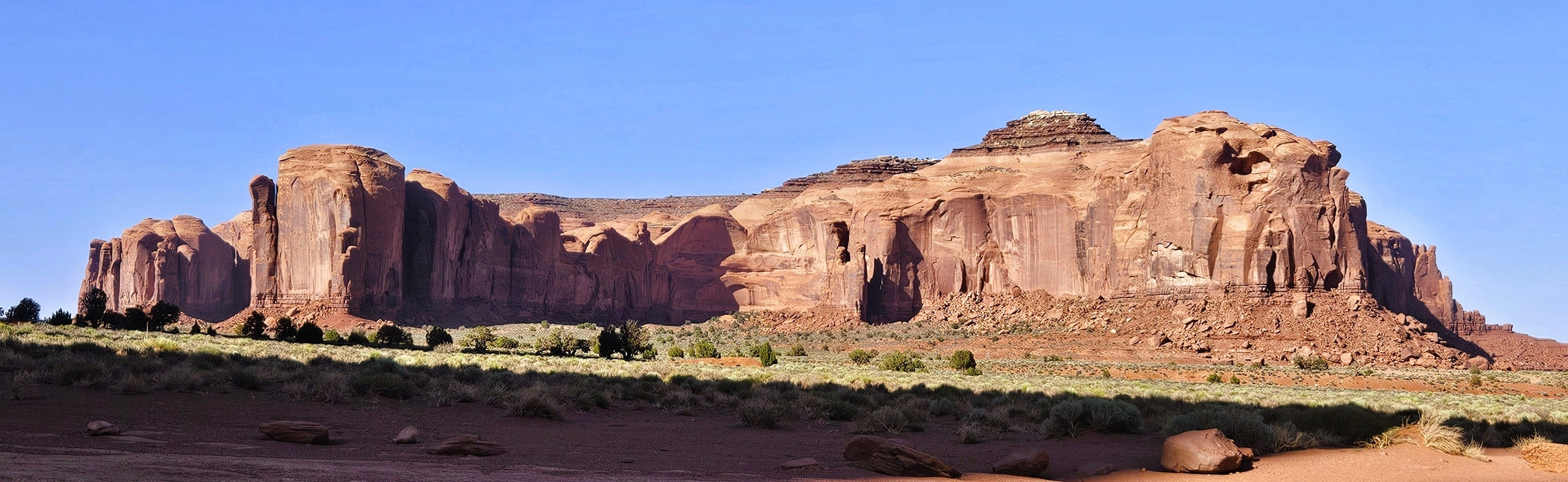
Southwest aspect

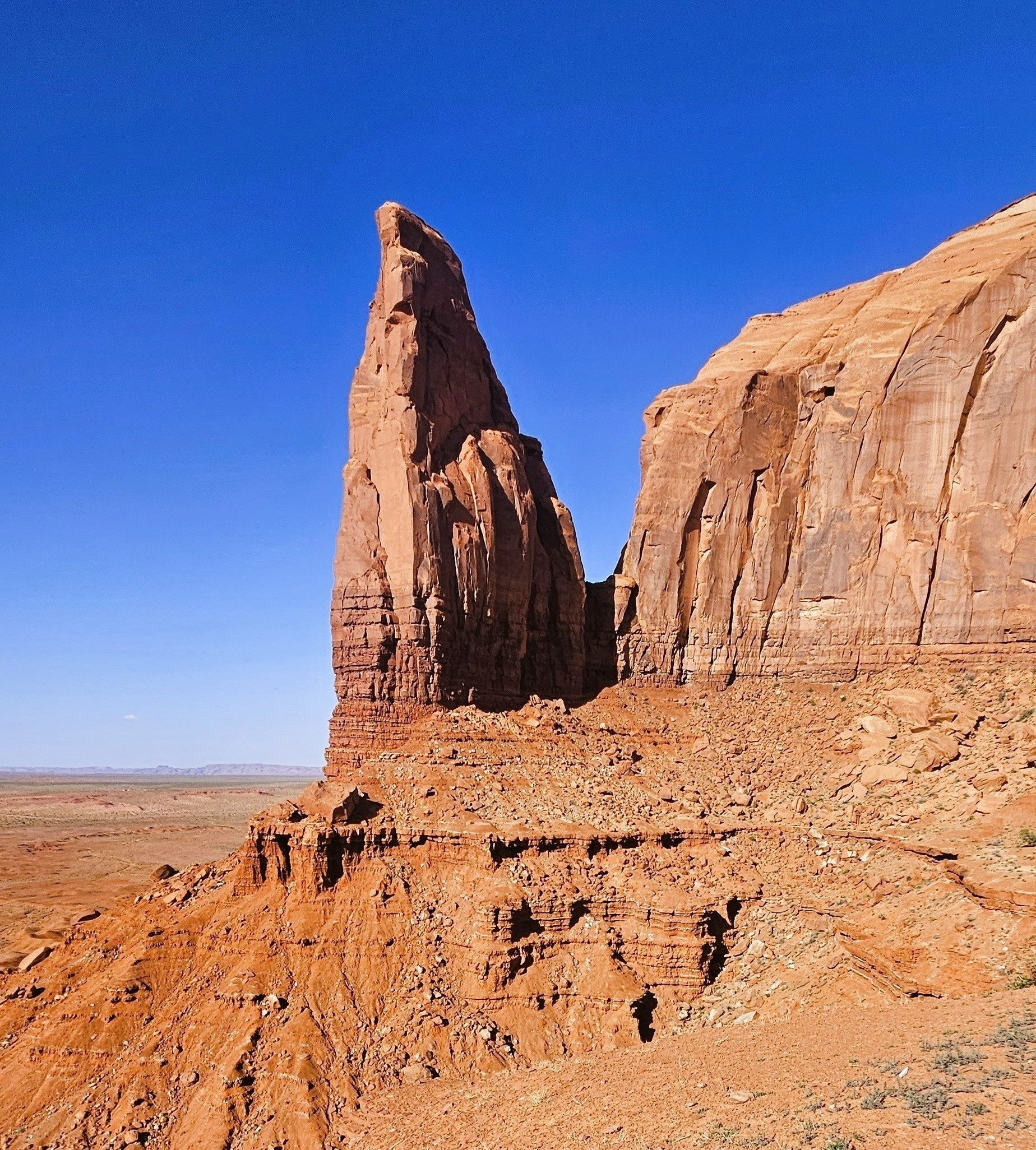
The "Spearhead" of Spearhead Mesa

== See also ==
- List of mountains in Arizona
- List of appearances of Monument Valley in the media
