= Setting Hen Butte =

Butte in San Juan County, Utah, United States

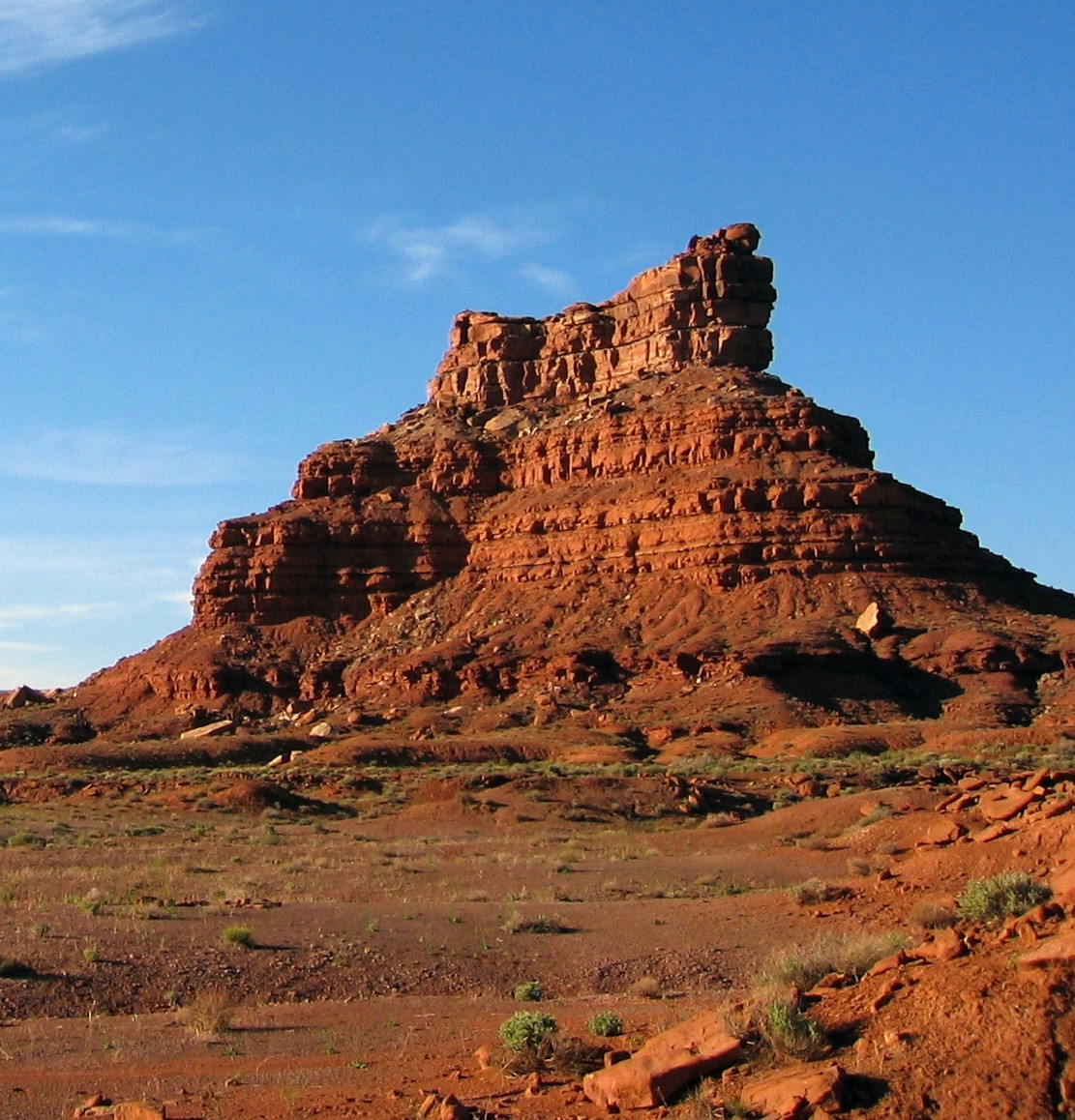
- South aspect

Highest point
- Elevation: 5,055 ft (1,541 m)
- Prominence: 235 ft (72 m)
- Parent peak: Rooster Butte
- Isolation: 0.42 mi (0.68 km)
- Coordinates: 37°16′17″N 109°48′25″W

Geography
- Location within Utah Location within the United States
- Location: Valley of the Gods; San Juan County, Utah, U.S.
- Parent range: Colorado Plateau
- Topo map: USGS Cigarette Spring Cave

Geology
- Rock age: Permian
- Mountain type: Butte
- Rock type: Sandstone

Climbing
- Easiest route: class 5.7 climbing

Setting Hen Butte is a 5,055-foot-elevation (1,541-meter) summit in San Juan County, Utah, United States.

Setting Hen Butte should not be confused with another butte named Setting Hen within the same county but further southwest at Monument Valley, near Eagle Mesa.

== Description ==
Setting Hen Butte is situated 13.5 miles (21.7 km) west of Bluff, Utah, in the Valley of the Gods, on land administered by the Bureau of Land Management. Precipitation runoff from this iconic landform's slopes drains to the San Juan River via Lime Creek. Access to the butte is via the 17-mile Valley of the Gods Road which passes east of this butte. Topographic relief is significant as the summit rises 300 feet (91 meters) above the surrounding terrain in 0.1 mile (0.16 km). This landform's descriptive toponym has been officially adopted by the United States Board on Geographic Names. It is also known as "The Anvil" by some rock climbers.

== Geology ==
Setting Hen Butte is composed of two principal strata of the Cutler Formation. The bottom layer is slope-forming Halgaito Formation and the upper stratum is cliff-forming Cedar Mesa Sandstone. Cedar Mesa Sandstone is the remains of coastal sand dunes deposited about 270 to 300 million years ago, during the Wolfcampian (early Permian). The buttes of Valley of the Gods are the result of the Halgaito Formation being more easily eroded than the overlaying sandstone. The valley floor is Honaker Trail Formation.

== Climate ==
Spring and fall are the most favorable seasons to visit Setting Hen Butte. According to the Köppen climate classification system, it is located in a cold semi-arid climate zone with cold winters and hot summers. Summers highs rarely exceed 100 °F (38 °C). Summer nights are comfortably cool, and temperatures drop quickly after sunset. Winters are cold, but daytime highs are usually above freezing. Winter temperatures below 0 °F (−18 °C) are uncommon, though possible. This desert climate receives less than 10 inches (250 millimeters) of annual rainfall, and snowfall is generally light during the winter.

== Gallery ==
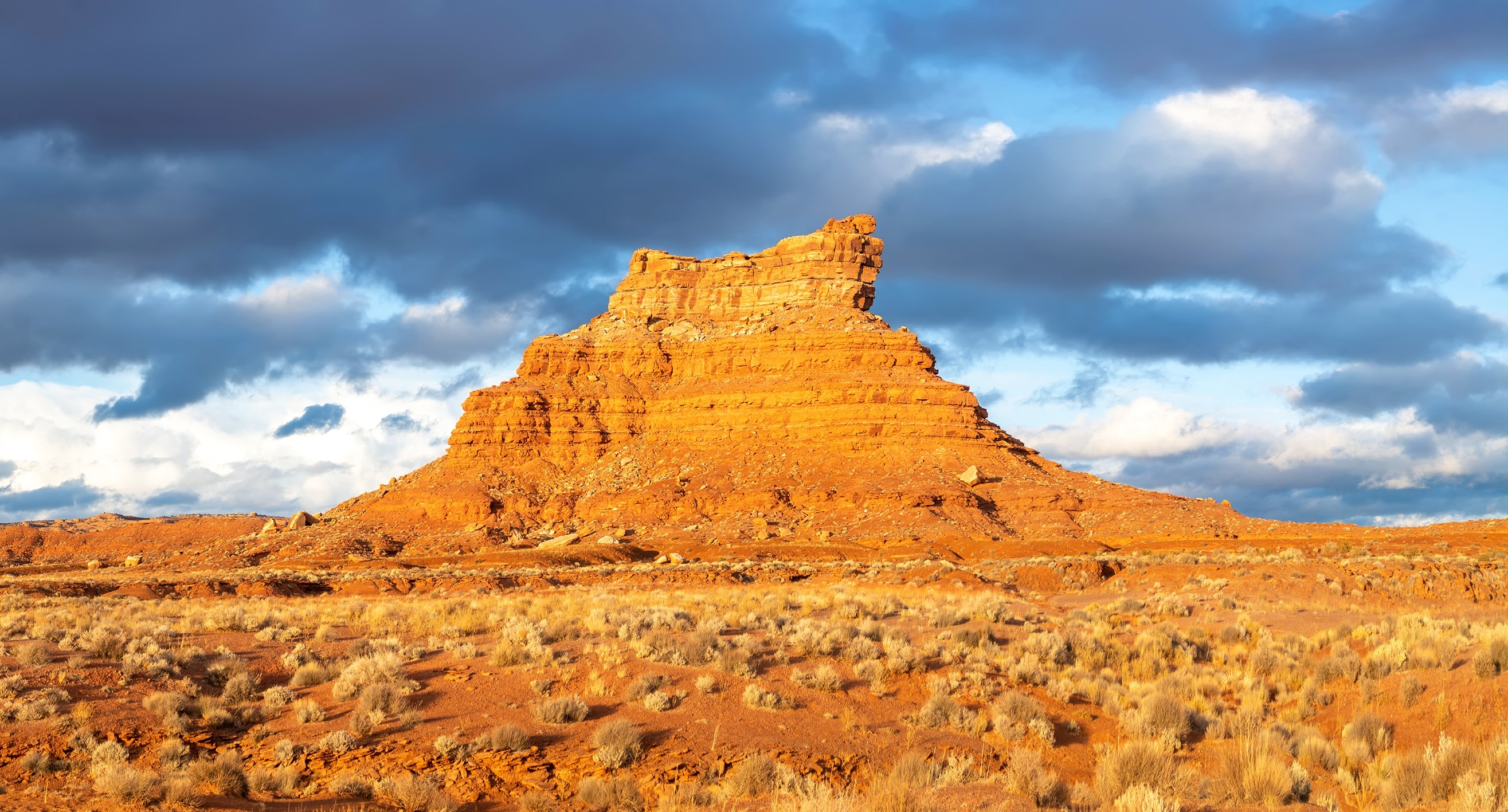

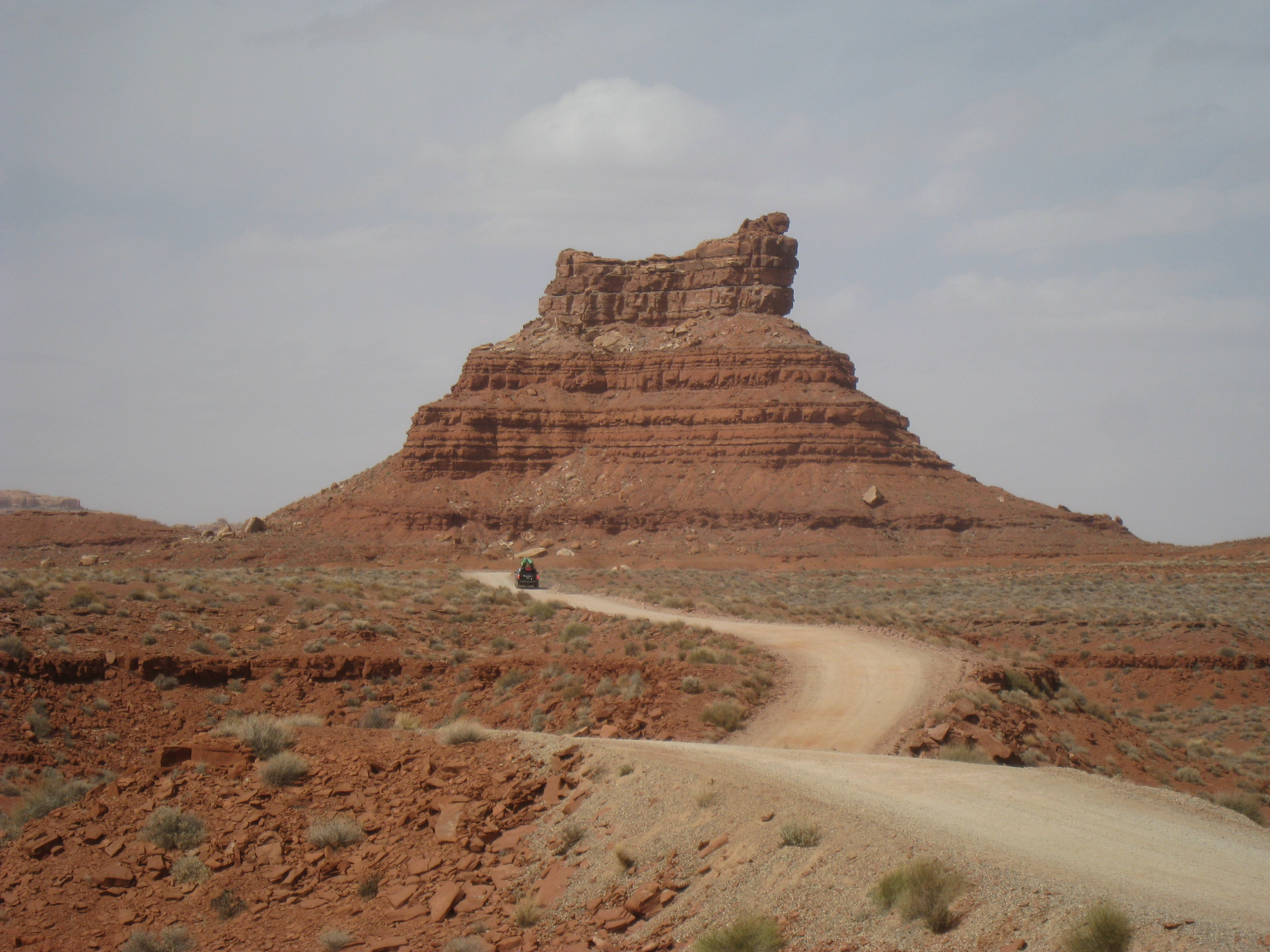
South aspect

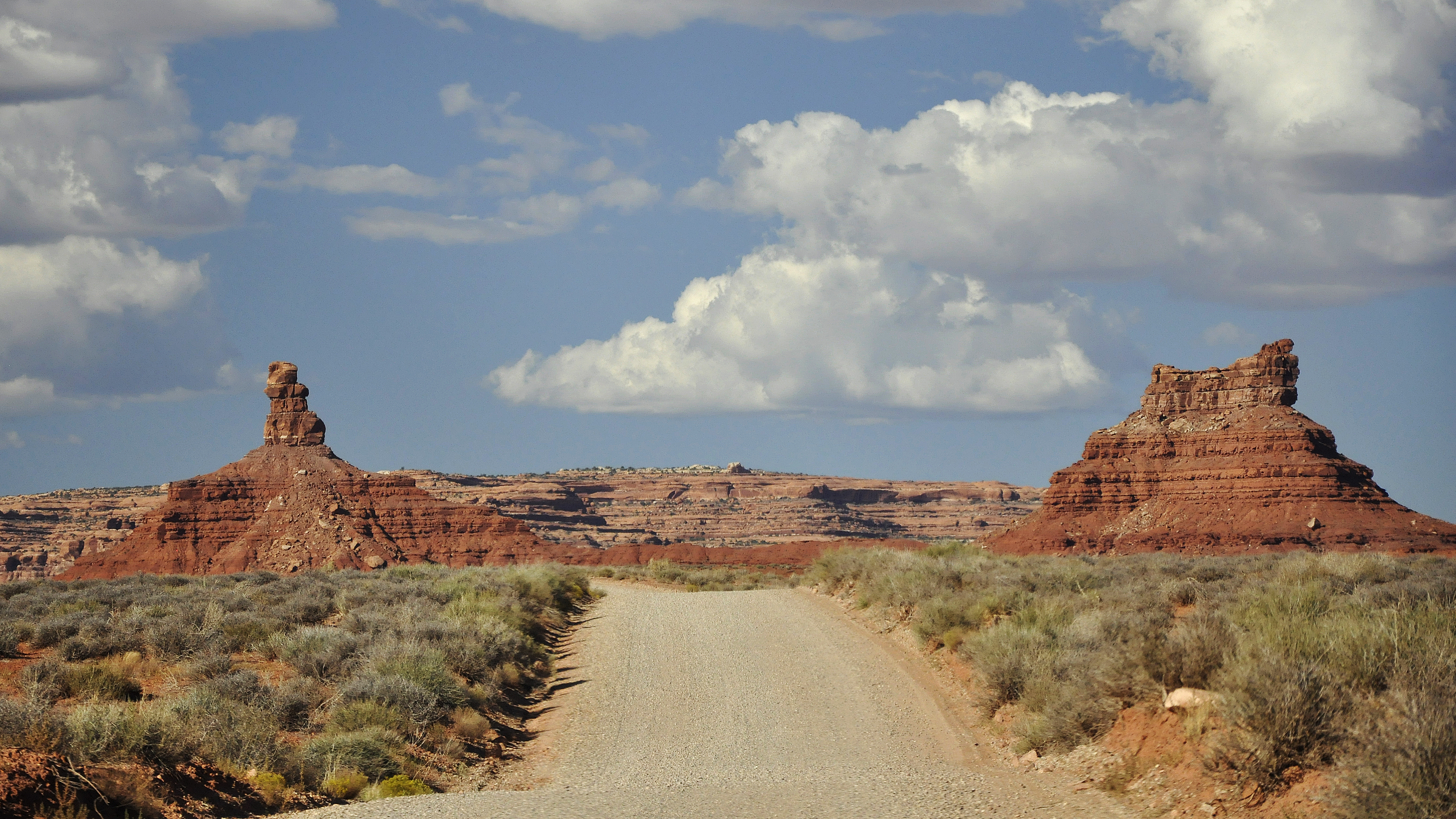
South aspect of Rooster Butte (left) and Setting Hen Butte (right)

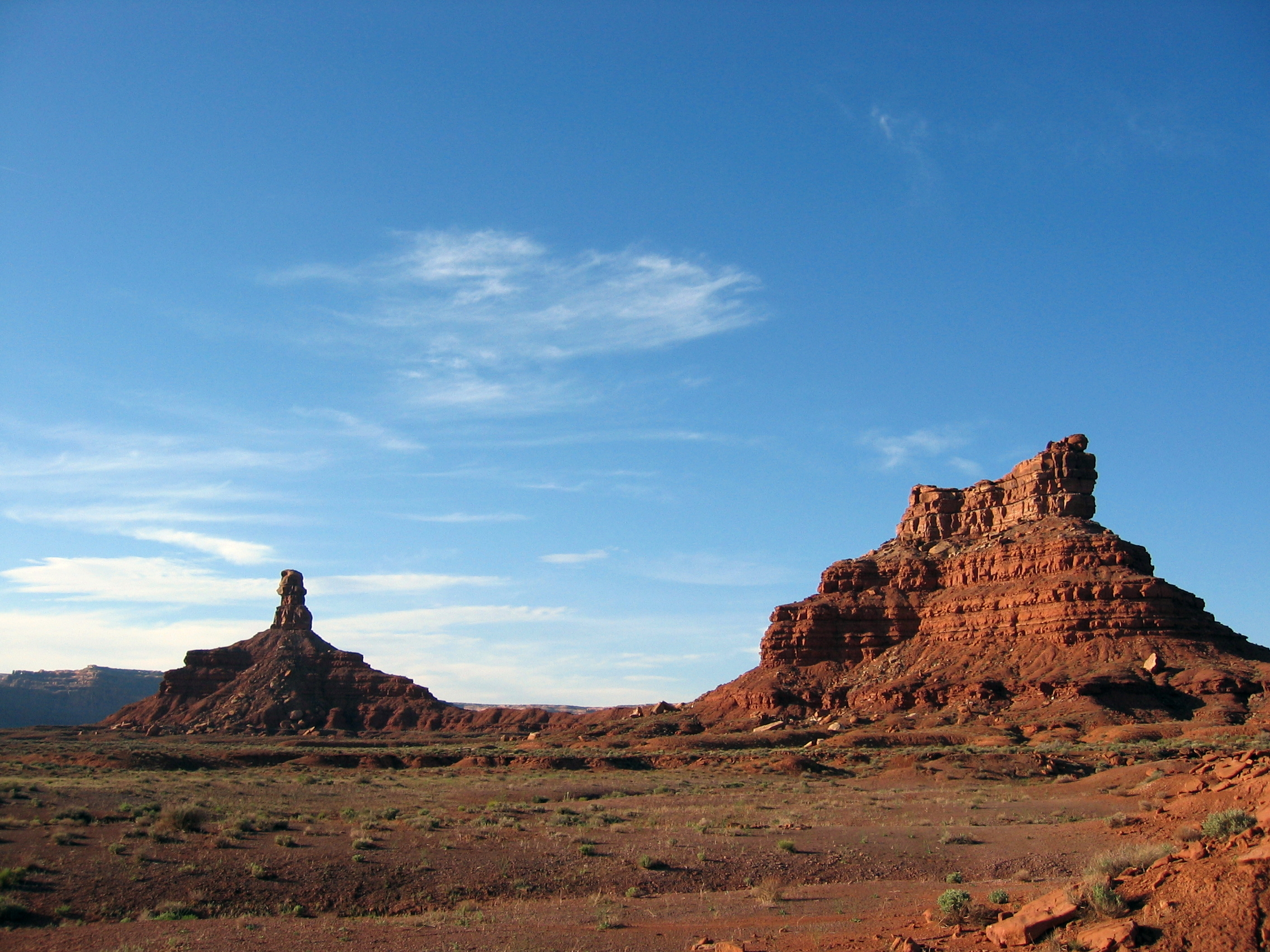
Rooster Butte (left) and Setting Hen Butte (right)

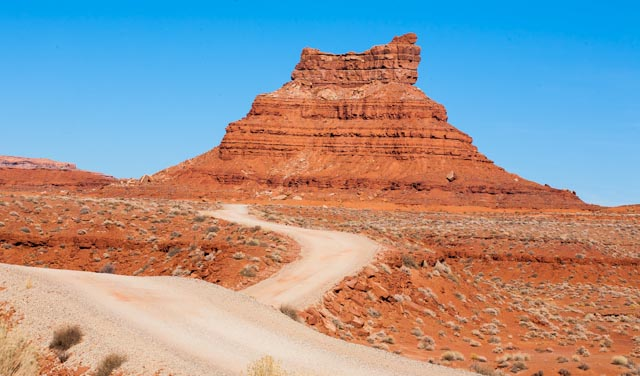
South aspect

== See also ==
- List of mountains of Utah
