= Eagle Mesa =

Mountain in Utah, United States

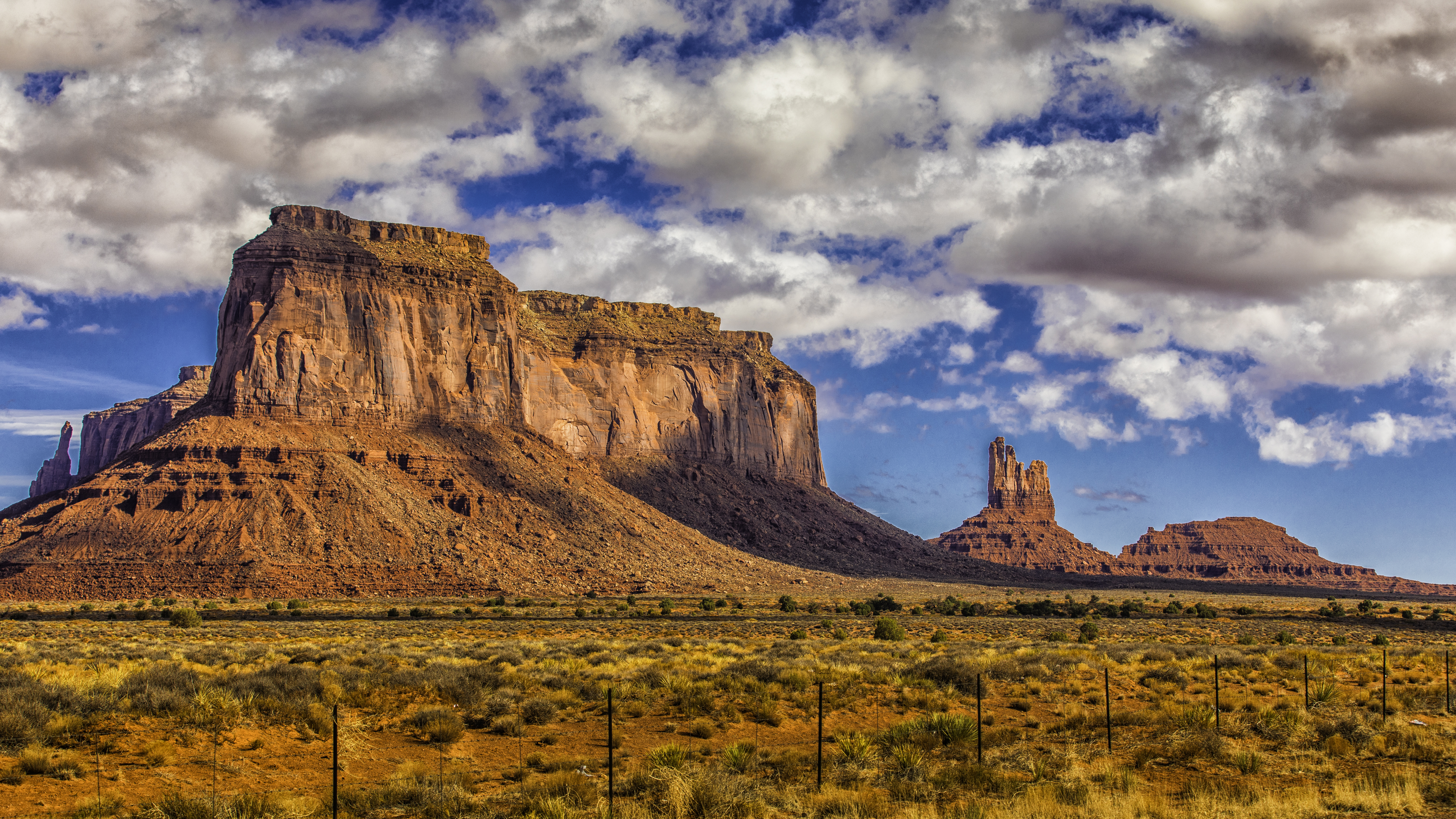
- Southwest aspect

Highest point
- Elevation: 6,624 ft (2,019 m)
- Prominence: 880 ft (268 m)
- Parent peak: Brighams Tomb (6,739 ft)
- Isolation: 2.05 mi (3.30 km)
- Coordinates: 37°02′51″N 110°07′18″W

Geography
- Location within Utah Location within the United States
- Location: Monument Valley; San Juan County, Utah, U.S.
- Parent range: Colorado Plateau
- Topo map: USGS Monument Pass

Geology
- Mountain type: Mesa
- Rock type: Sandstone

Climbing
- Easiest route: class 5.x climbing

Eagle Mesa is a 6,624-foot-elevation (2,019-meter) summit in San Juan County, Utah, United States.

== Description ==
Eagle Mesa is situated 4.5 miles (7.2 km) northeast of Oljato–Monument Valley, Utah, on Navajo Nation land. It is, together with Setting Hen, an iconic landform of Monument Valley and can be seen from Highway 163.

Precipitation runoff from this mesa's slopes drains to Mitchell Butte Wash and Train Rock Wash which are both part of the San Juan River drainage basin. Topographic relief is significant as the summit rises 1,100 feet (335 meters) above surrounding terrain in 0.6 mile (1 km). The nearest higher neighbor is Brighams Tomb, 2.05 miles (3.30 km) to the east. This landform's toponym has been officially adopted by the United States Board on Geographic Names. Navajo names for the mesa are "Wide Rock", "Where the Eagles Roost", "Water Basket Sits", and "Trees Hanging from Surrounding Belt" because there were once numerous trees here. In Navajo mythology, Eagle Mesa is a place where spirits of the deceased may go. Eagle Rock Spire is a 300-ft tower on the northern tip of the mesa which requires class 5.9 climbing skill to reach the summit. Navajo names for this spire which resembles a perched eagle include "Eagle Alongside Mesa", "Big Finger is Pointed", and Tsé Łichii Dahazkani (Elevated Red Rock Sitting Up). The first ascent of the spire was made on April 23, 1970, by Fred Beckey and Eric Bjornstad.

== Geology ==
Eagle Mesa is a mesa composed of three principal strata. The bottom layer is Organ Rock Shale, the next stratum is cliff-forming De Chelly Sandstone, and the upper layer is Moenkopi Formation capped by Shinarump Conglomerate. The rock ranges in age from Permian at the bottom to Late Triassic at the top. The buttes and mesas of Monument Valley are the result of the Organ Rock Shale being more easily eroded than the overlaying sandstone.

== Climate ==
Spring and fall are the most favorable seasons to visit Eagle Mesa. According to the Köppen climate classification system, it is located in a semi-arid climate zone with cold winters and hot summers. Summers average 54 days above 90 °F (32 °C) annually, and highs rarely exceed 100 °F (38 °C). Summer nights are comfortably cool, and temperatures drop quickly after sunset. Winters are cold, but daytime highs are usually above freezing. Winter temperatures below 0 °F (−18 °C) are uncommon, though possible. This desert climate receives less than 10 inches (250 millimeters) of annual rainfall, and snowfall is generally light during the winter.

== In popular culture ==
Eagle Mesa is briefly visible in the 1994 film Forrest Gump. In a scene depicting the titular character's cross-country run, the mesa appears to the right of the frame in the widescreen version of the film, along with Brighams Tomb and Stagecoach.

For Earth Day 2025, Google featured a Doodle showcasing satellite imagery of various natural formations spelling out the letters of its logo. Eagle Mesa was prominently displayed as the "L" in "Google," with its distinct L-shaped outline captured from space.

== Gallery ==
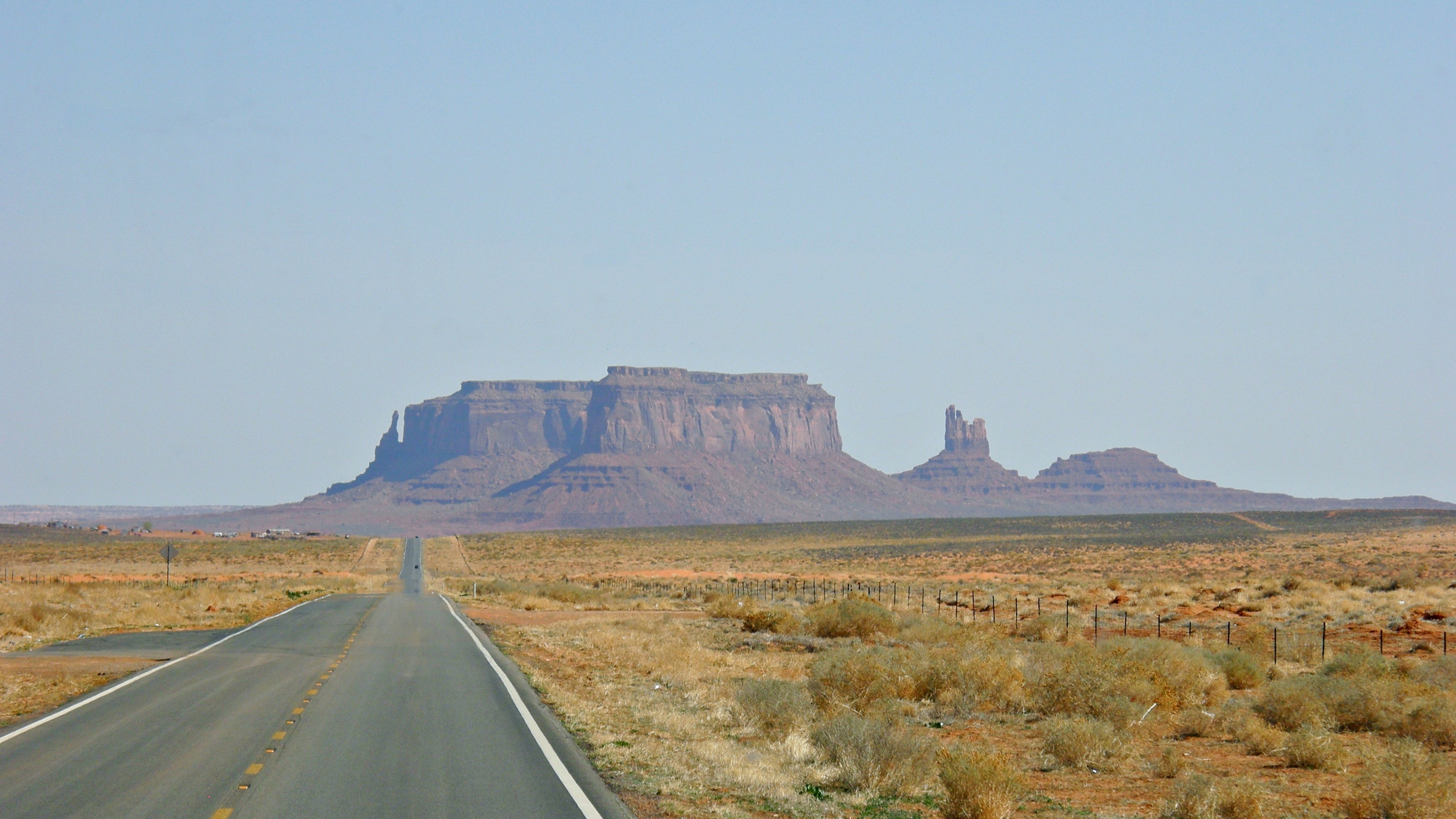
Southwest aspect, from Highway 163, Eagle Mesa and Setting Hen

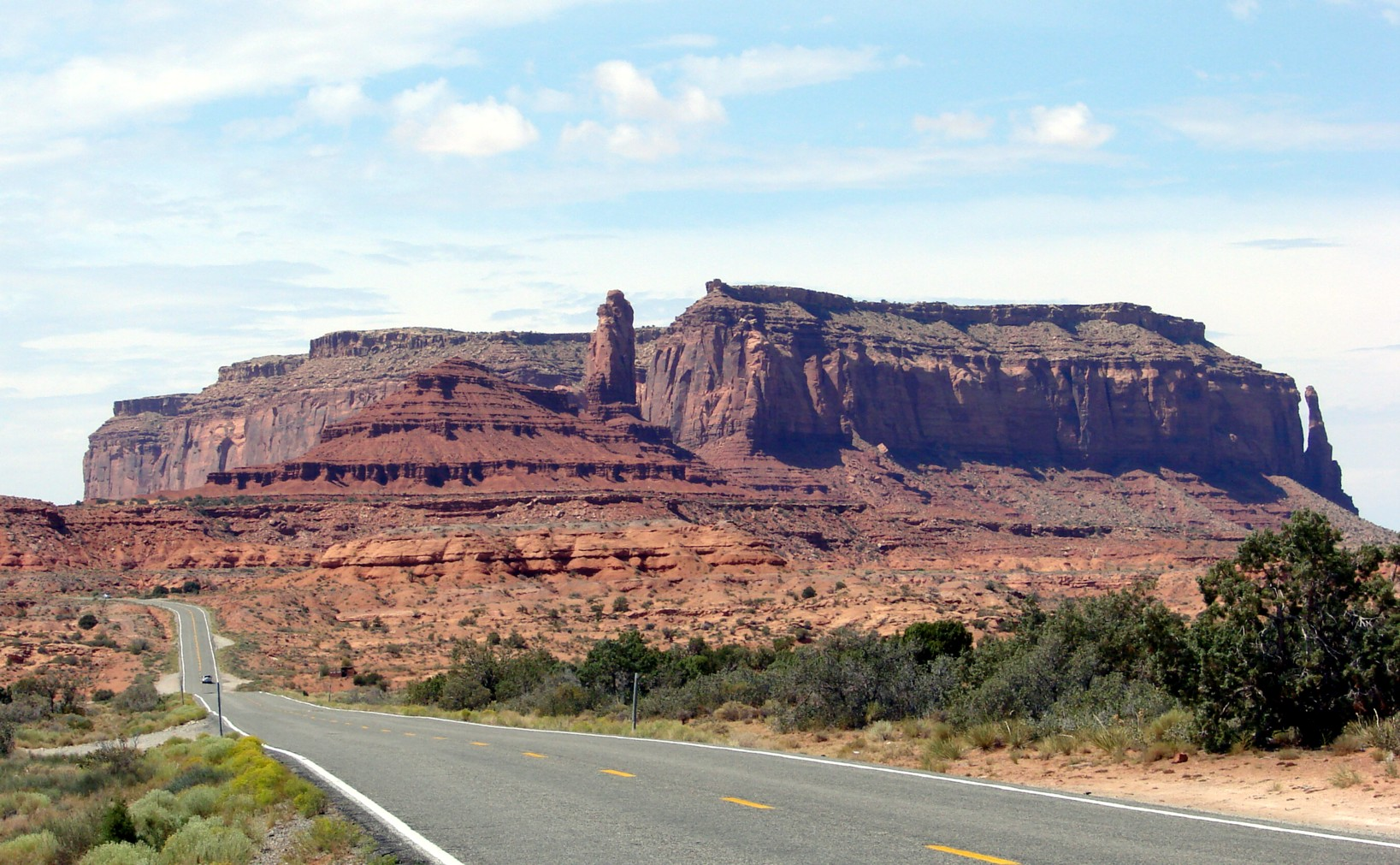
East-northeast aspect, from Highway 163. Eagle Rock Spire to right.

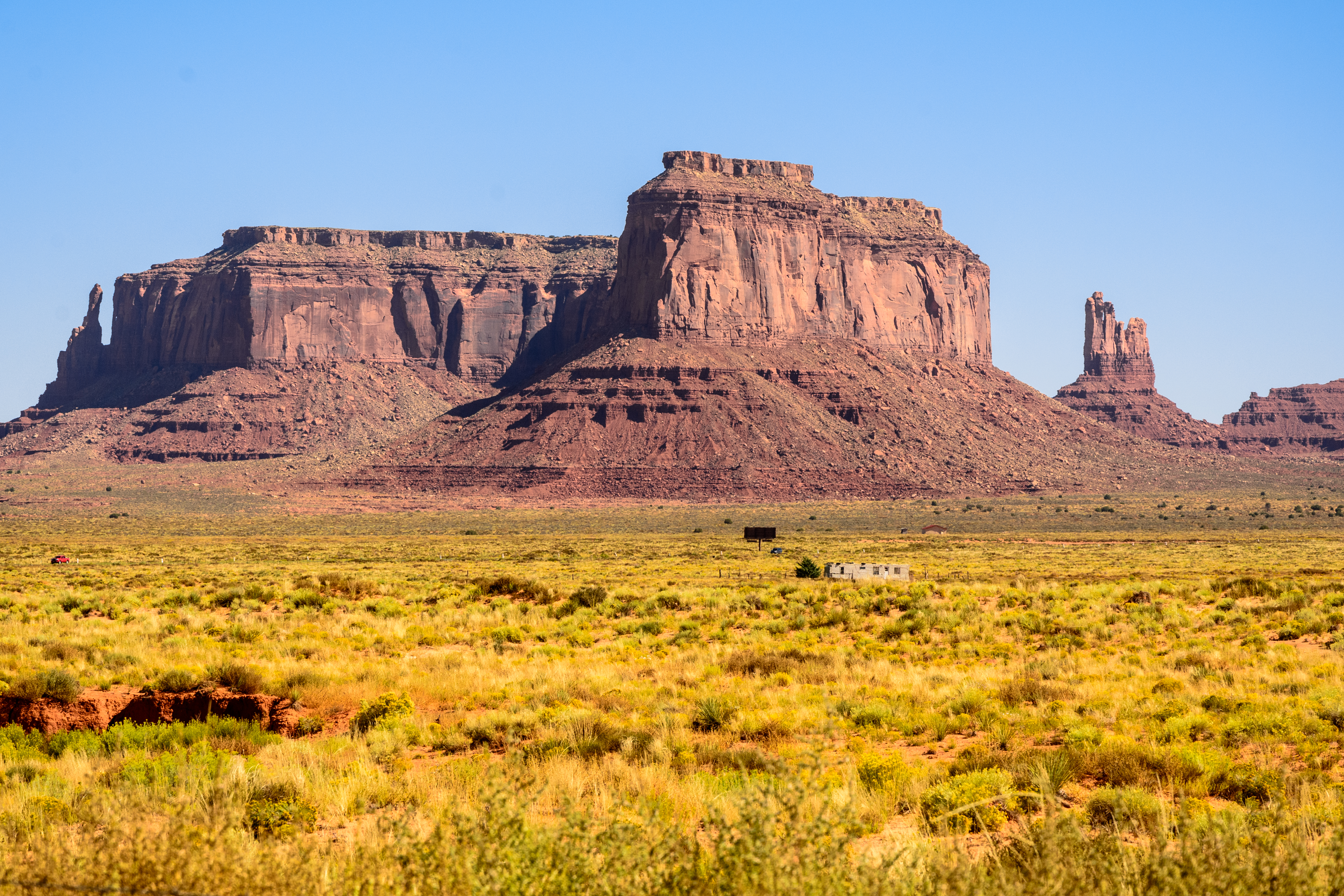
Southwest aspect. Eagle Rock Spire to left, Setting Hen to right.

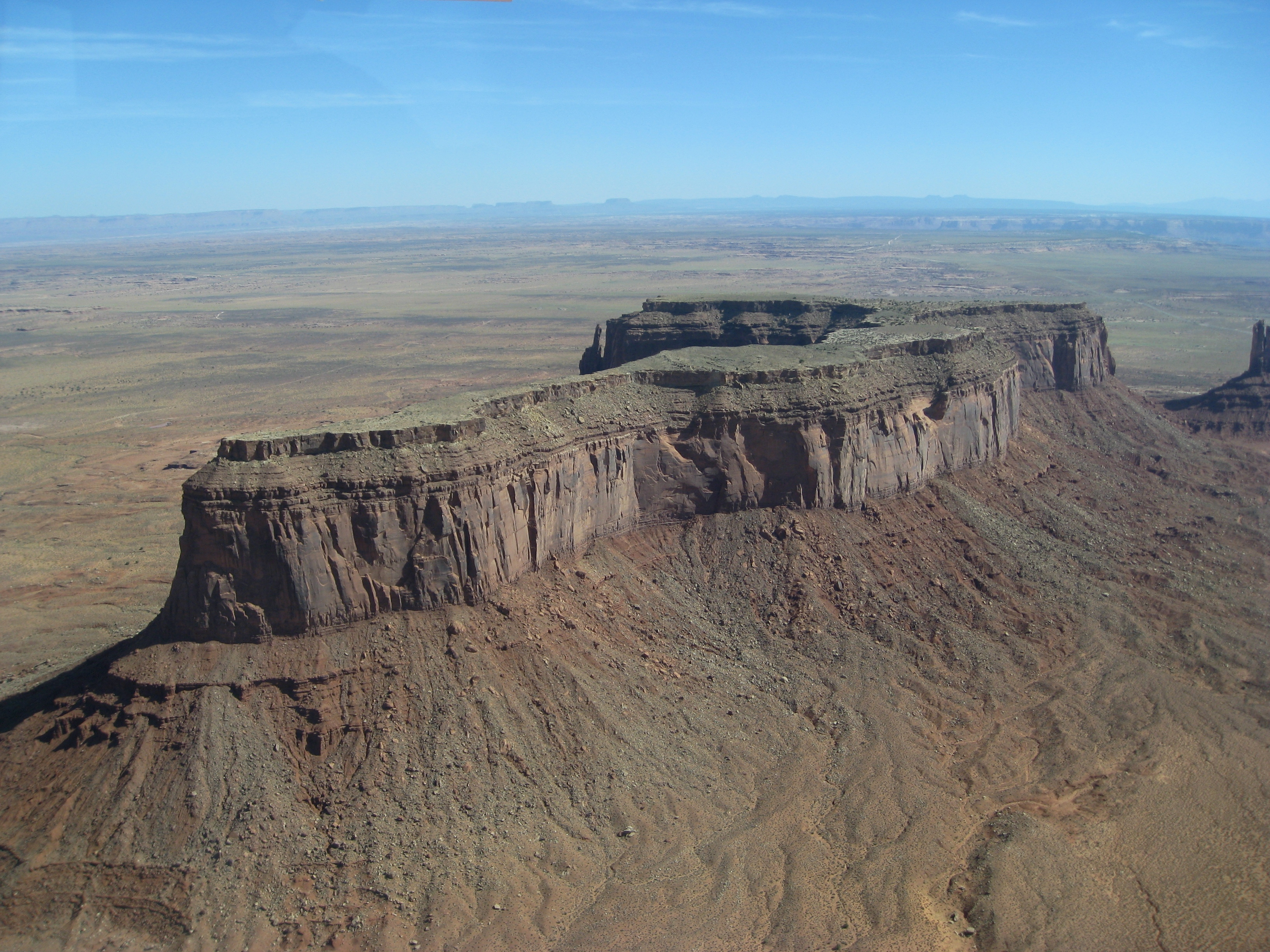
Aerial view, south aspect

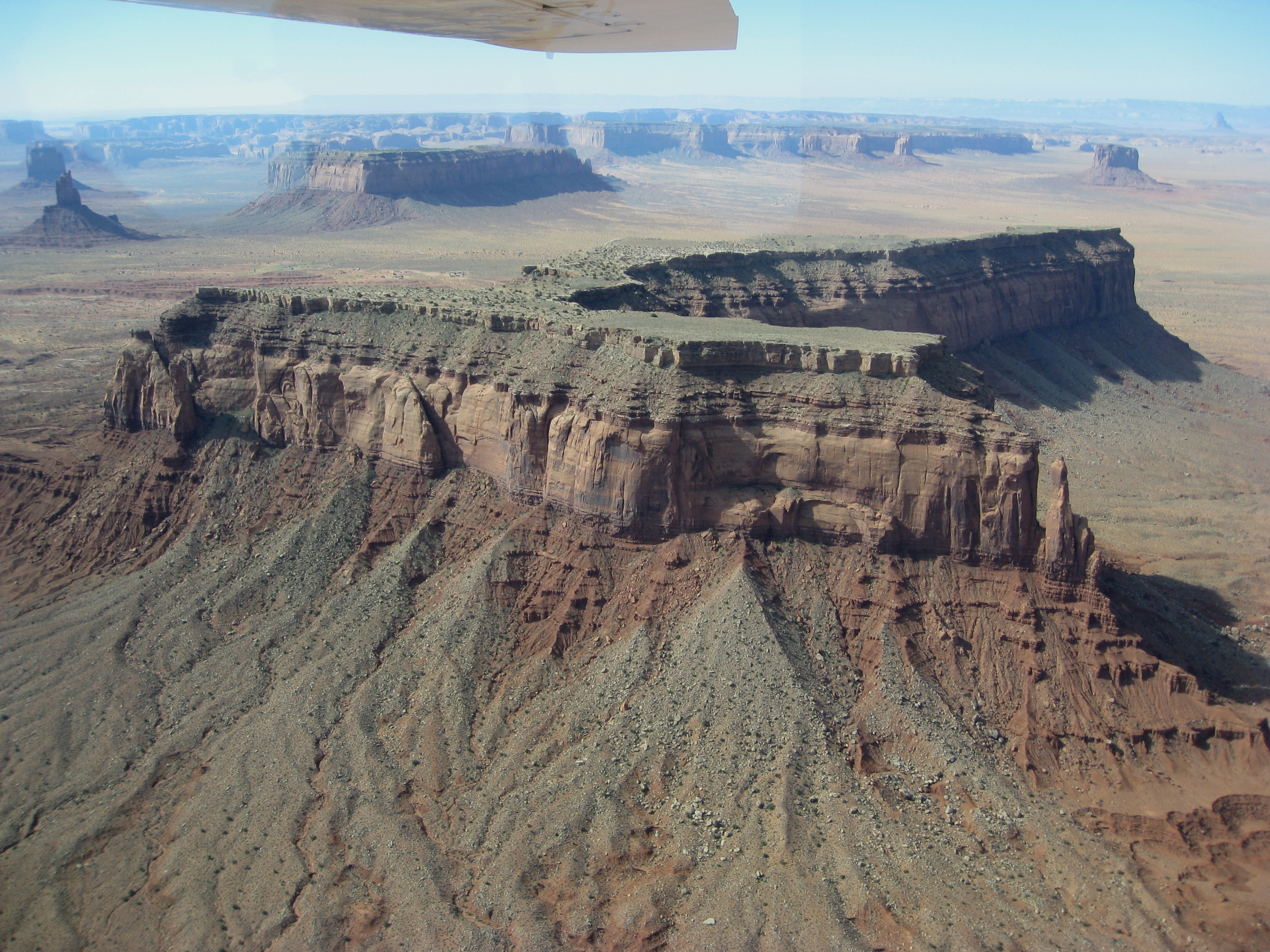
Aerial view, north aspect

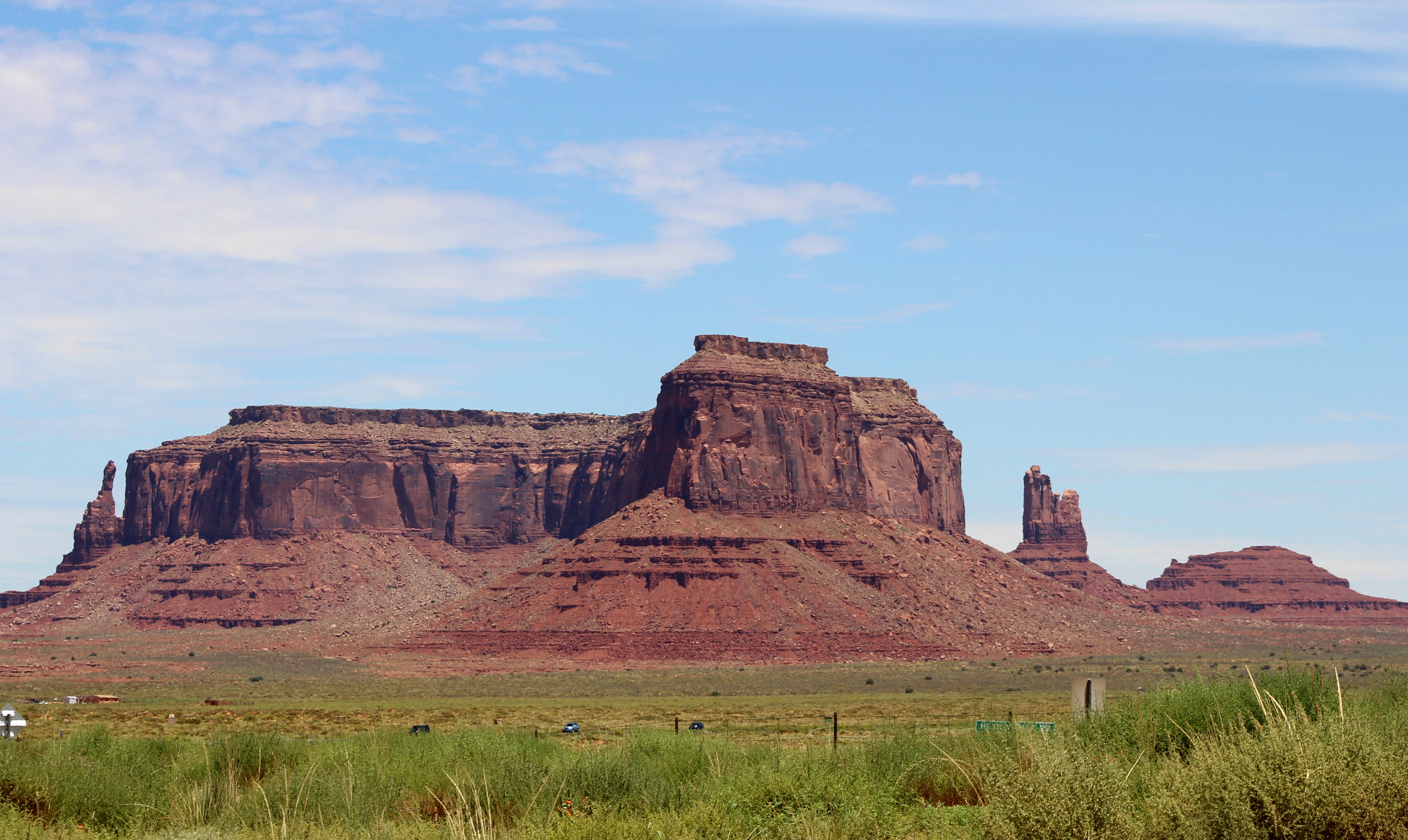
Southwest aspect. Eagle Rock Spire to left, Setting Hen to right.

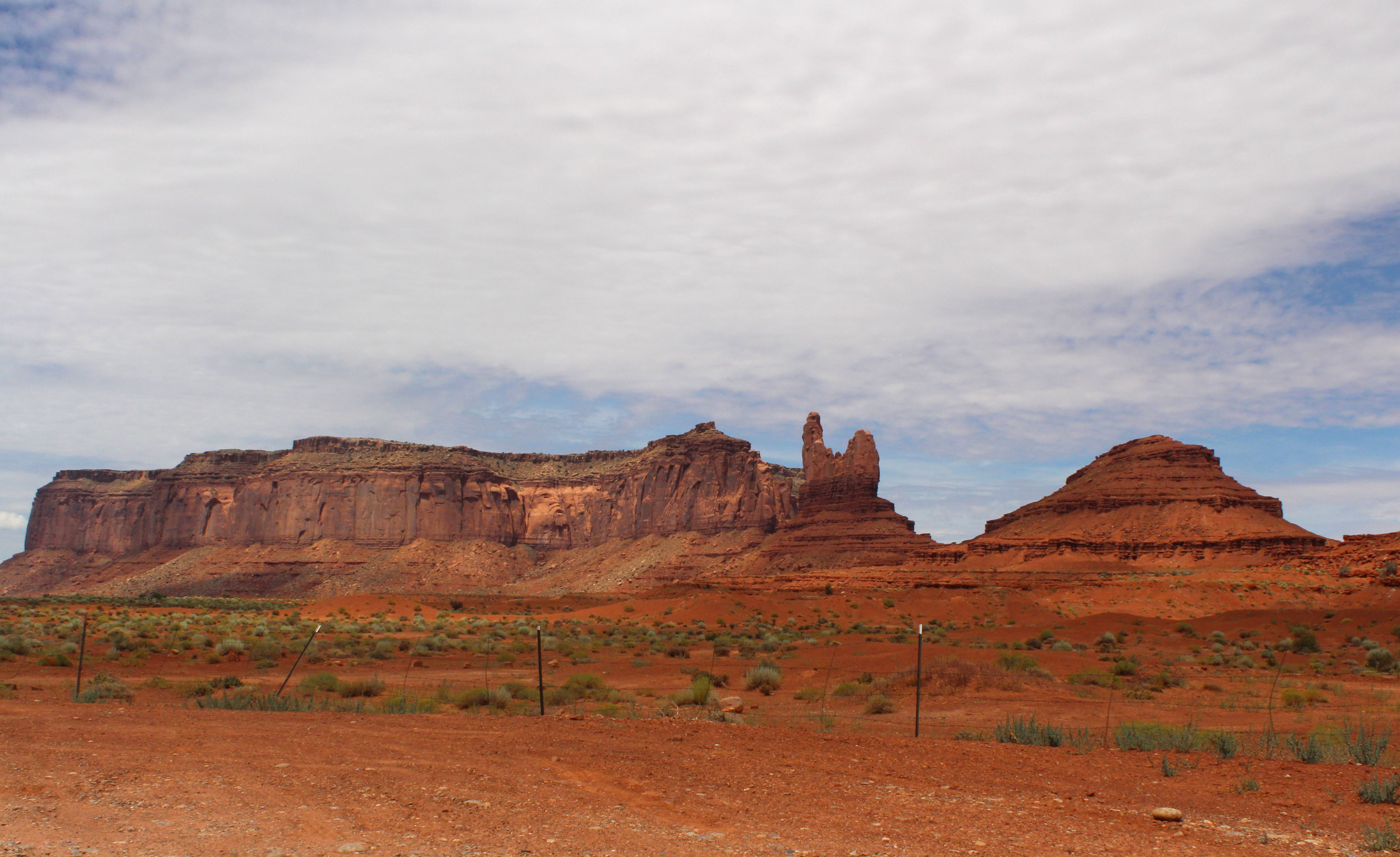
East aspect

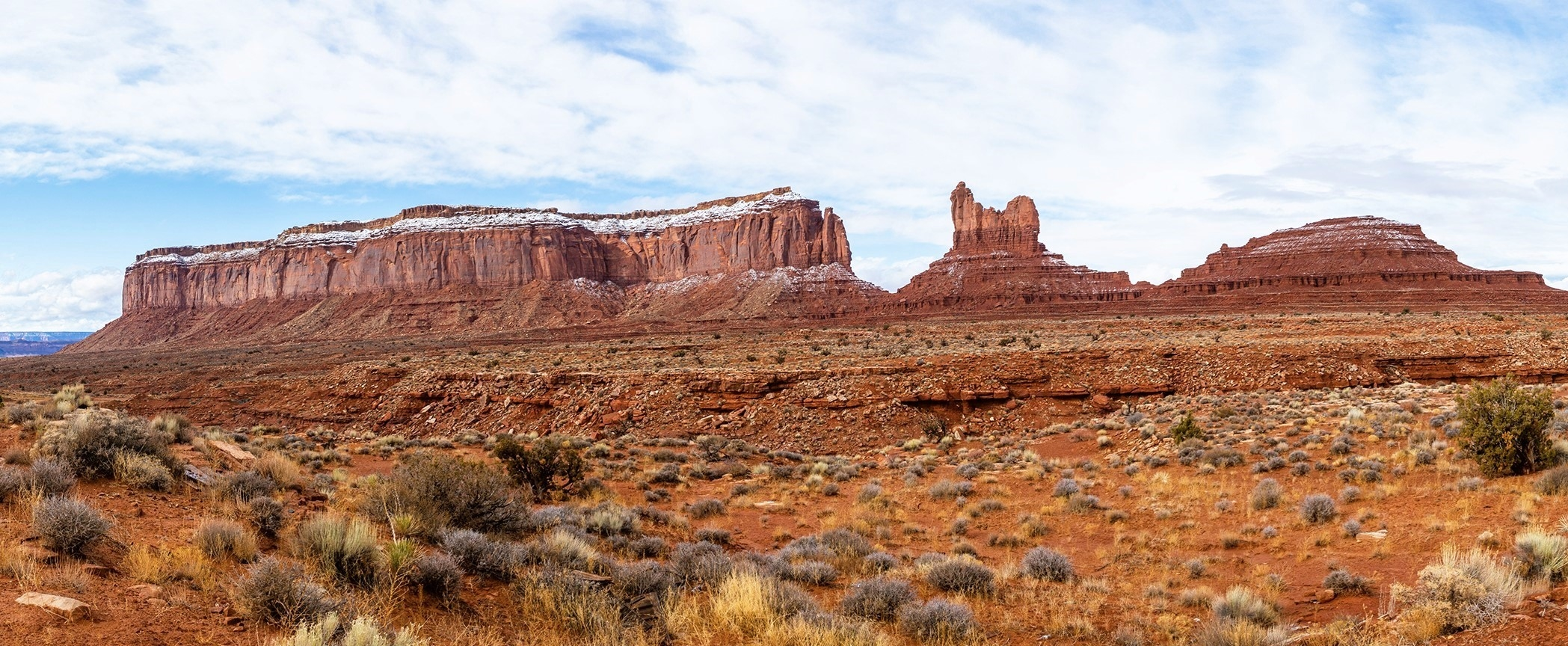
Eagle Mesa (left) and Setting Hen viewed from the south.

== See also ==
- List of appearances of Monument Valley in the media
- List of rock formations in Monument Valley
