= Setting Hen =

Butte in San Juan County, Utah, United States

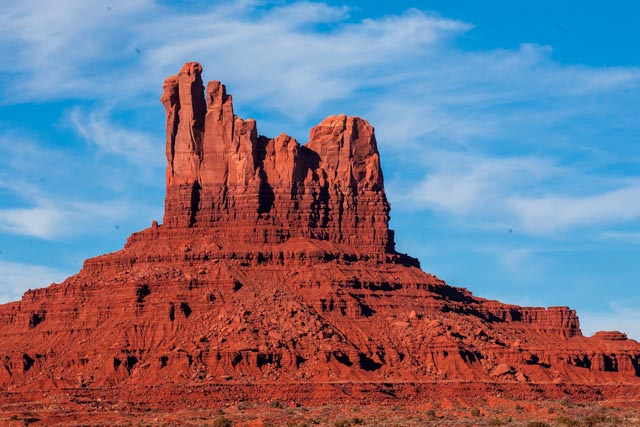
- South aspect

Highest point
- Elevation: 6,293 ft (1,918 m)
- Prominence: 440 ft (130 m)
- Parent peak: Eagle Mesa (6,624 ft)
- Isolation: 0.71 mi (1.14 km)
- Coordinates: 37°03′10″N 110°06′38″W

Geography
- Location within Utah Location within the United States
- Location: Monument Valley; San Juan County, Utah, U.S.
- Parent range: Colorado Plateau
- Topo map: USGS Monument Pass

Geology
- Rock age: Permian
- Rock type: Sandstone

Setting Hen is a 6,293-foot-elevation (1,918-meter) summit in San Juan County, Utah, United States.

Setting Hen should not be confused with another butte named Setting Hen Butte within the same county but further northeast at Valley of the Gods.

== Description ==
Setting Hen is situated 5.5 miles (8.9 km) northeast of Oljato–Monument Valley, Utah, on Navajo Nation land. It is an iconic landform of Monument Valley and can be seen from Highway 163. Precipitation runoff from this butte's slopes drains into the San Juan River drainage basin. Topographic relief is significant as the summit rises 600 feet (183 meters) above surrounding terrain in 0.25 mile (0.4 km). The nearest higher neighbor is Eagle Mesa, 0.71 miles (1.14 km) to the southwest. This landform's toponym has been officially adopted by the United States Board on Geographic Names, and the descriptive name refers to the profile resembling a sitting hen when viewed from the southeast.

== Geology ==
Setting Hen is a butte composed of two principal strata. The bottom layer is Organ Rock Shale and the upper stratum is cliff-forming De Chelly Sandstone. The rock was deposited during the Permian period. The buttes and mesas of Monument Valley are the result of the Organ Rock Shale being more easily eroded than the overlaying sandstone.

== Climate ==
Spring and fall are the most favorable seasons to visit Setting Hen. According to the Köppen climate classification system, it is located in a semi-arid climate zone with cold winters and hot summers. Summers average 54 days above 90 °F (32 °C) annually, and highs rarely exceed 100 °F (38 °C). Summer nights are comfortably cool, and temperatures drop quickly after sunset. Winters are cold, but daytime highs are usually above freezing. Winter temperatures below 0 °F (−18 °C) are uncommon, though possible. This desert climate receives less than 10 inches (250 millimeters) of annual rainfall, and snowfall is generally light during the winter.

== Gallery ==
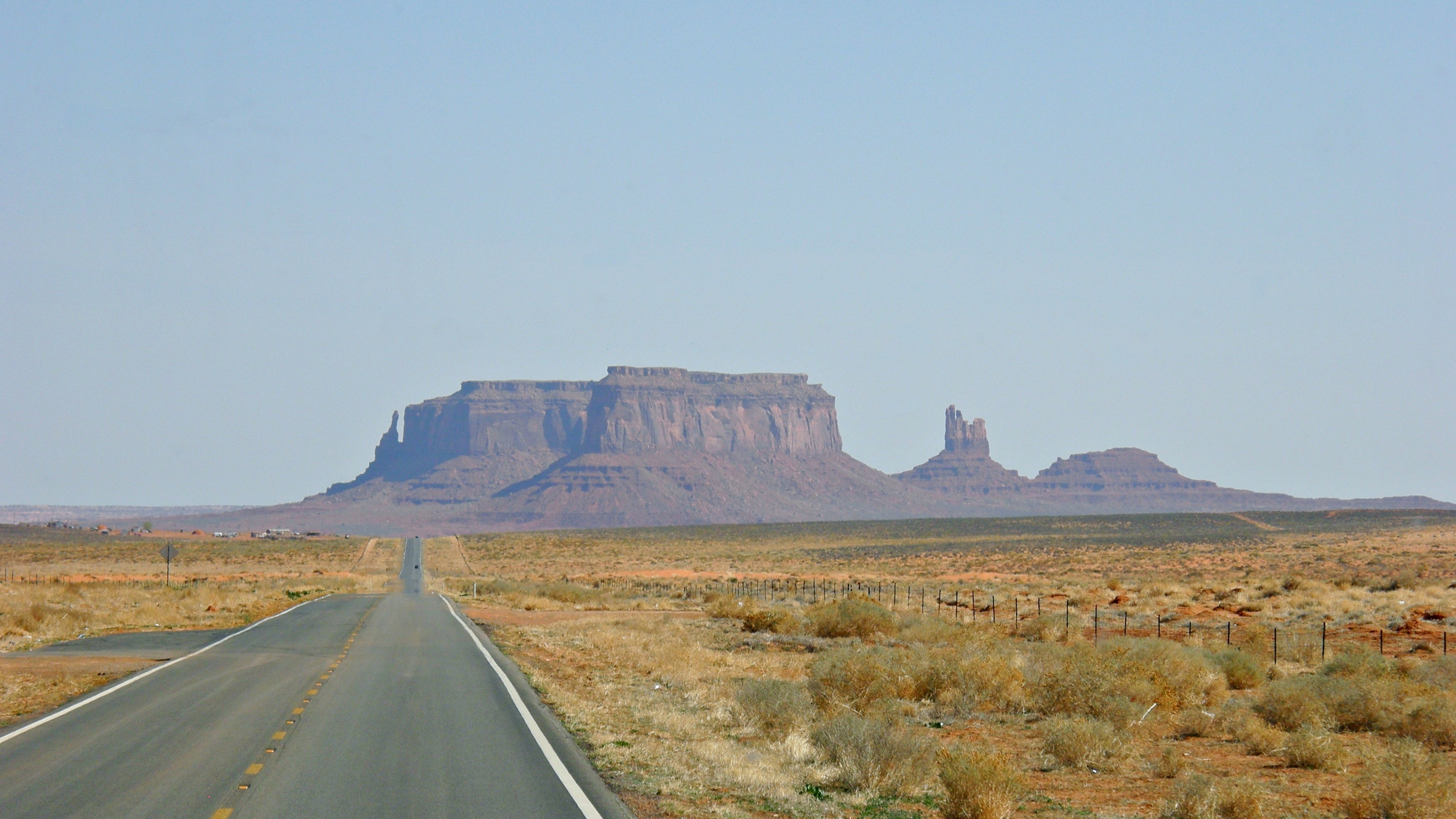
Southwest aspect, from Highway 163, Eagle Mesa and Setting Hen

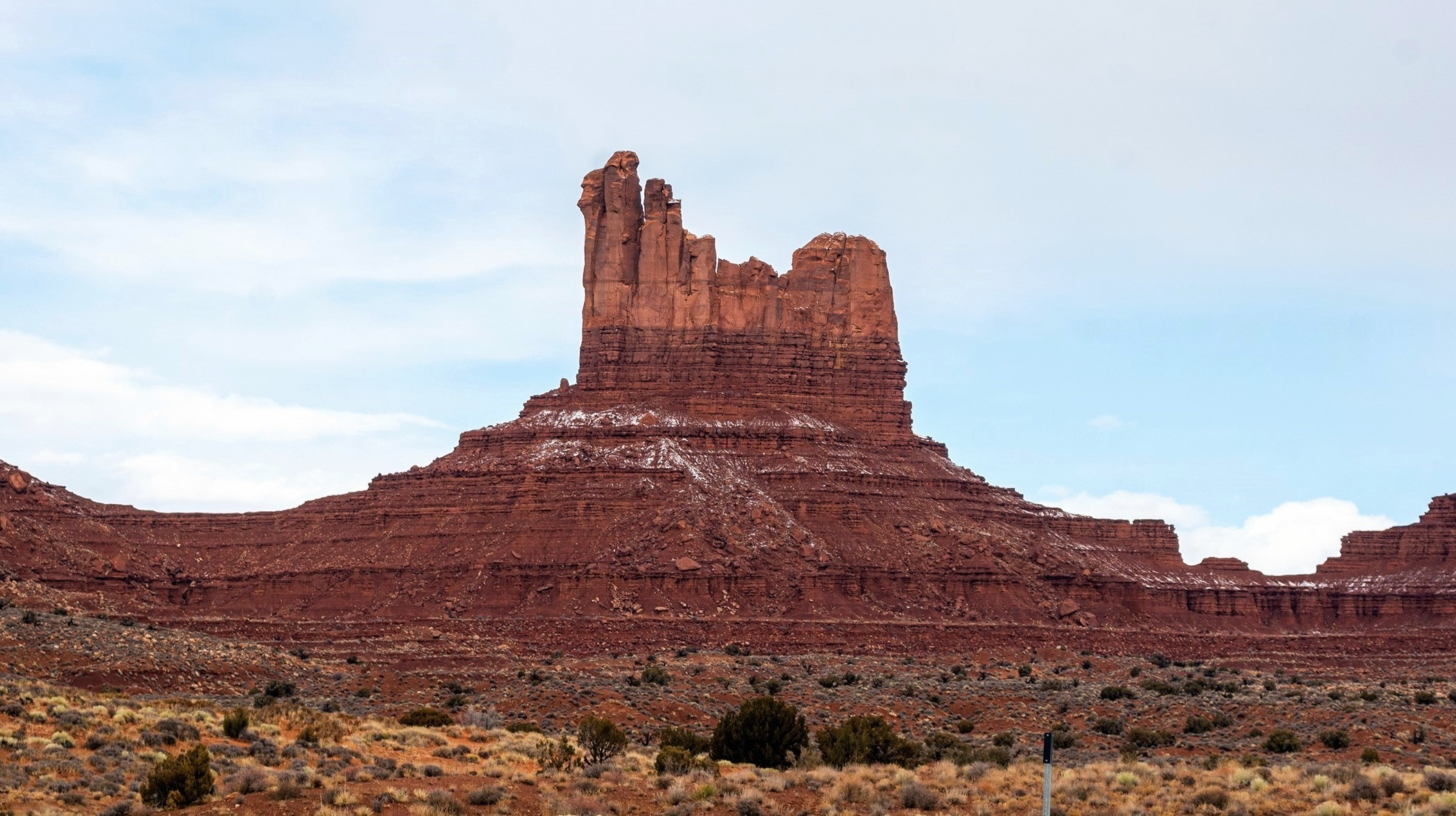
South aspect, with a dusting of autumn snow

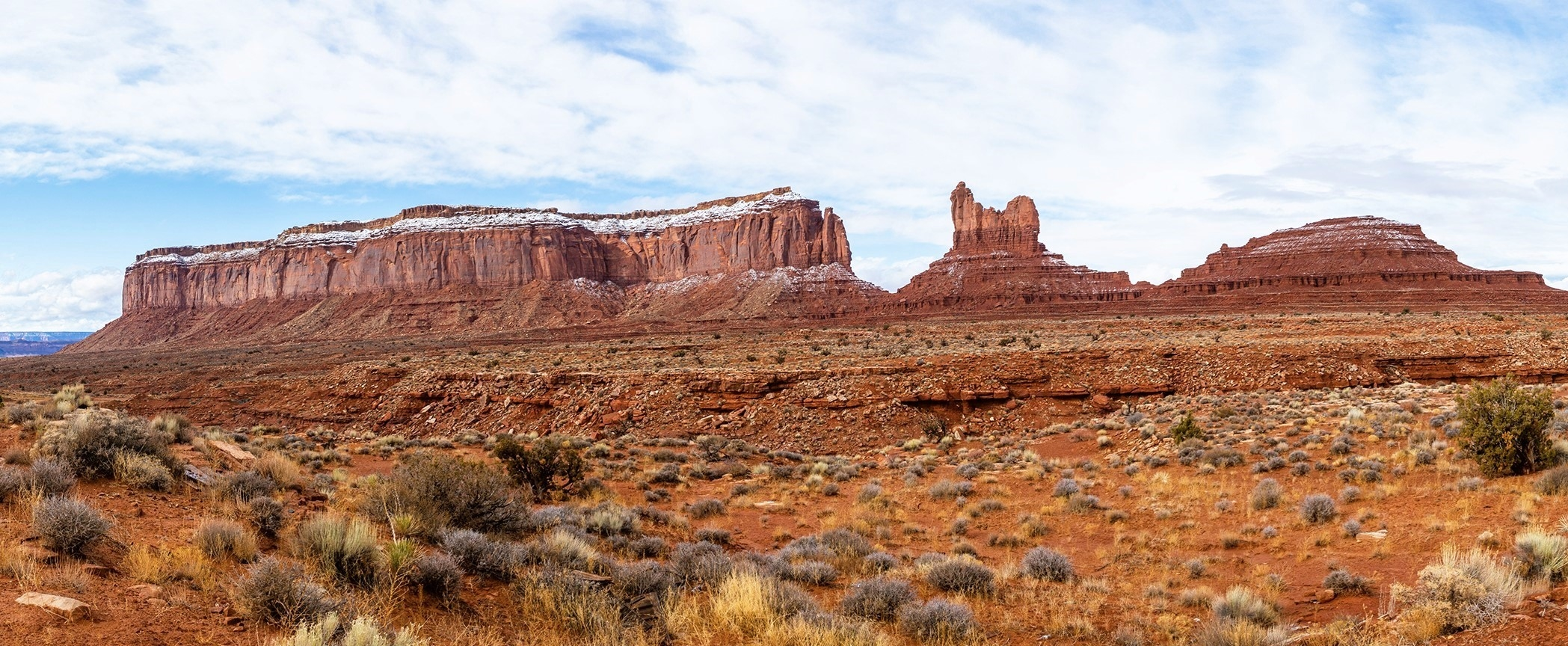
Eagle Mesa (left) and Setting Hen viewed from the south.

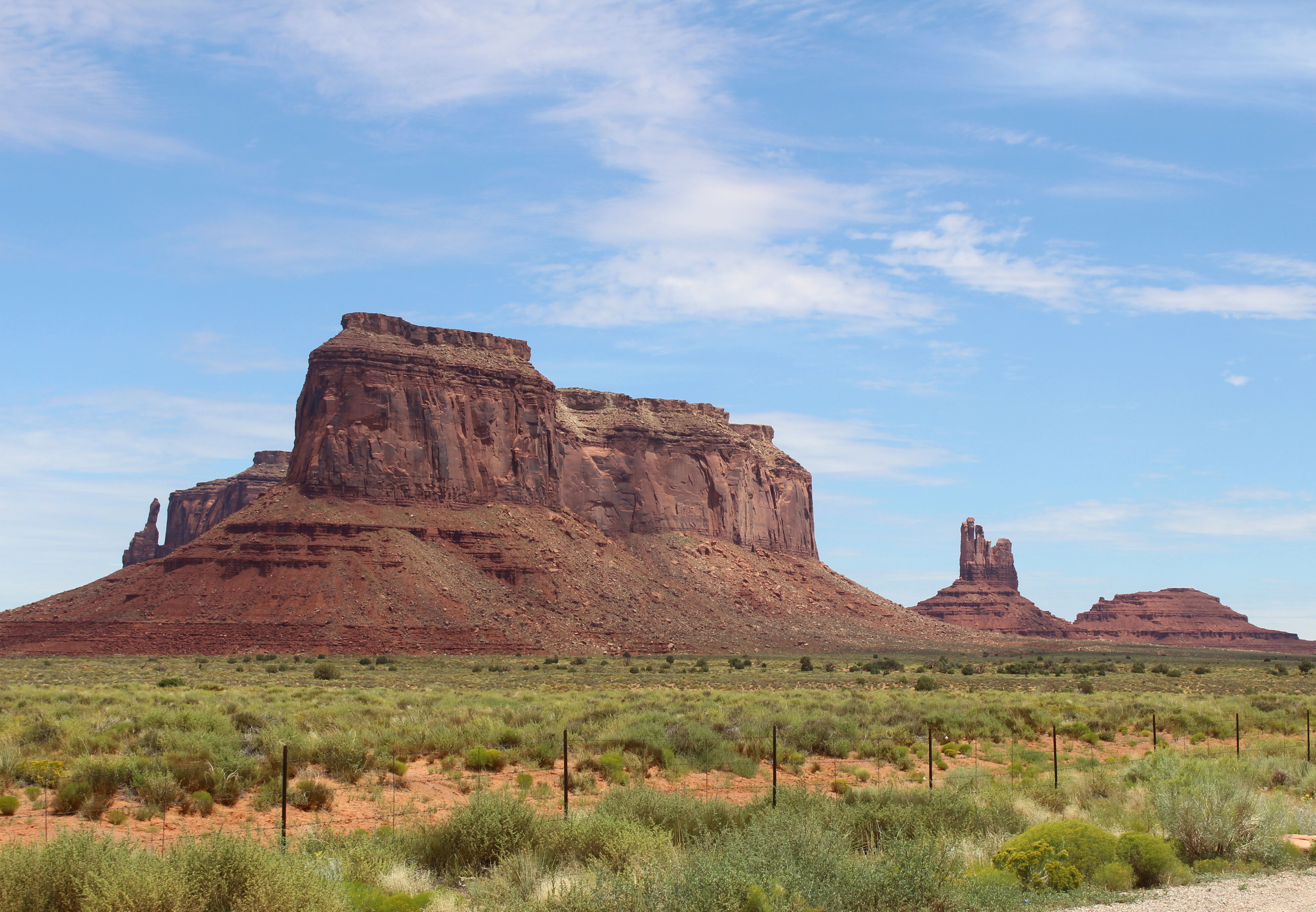
Eagle Mesa (left), Setting Hen (right)

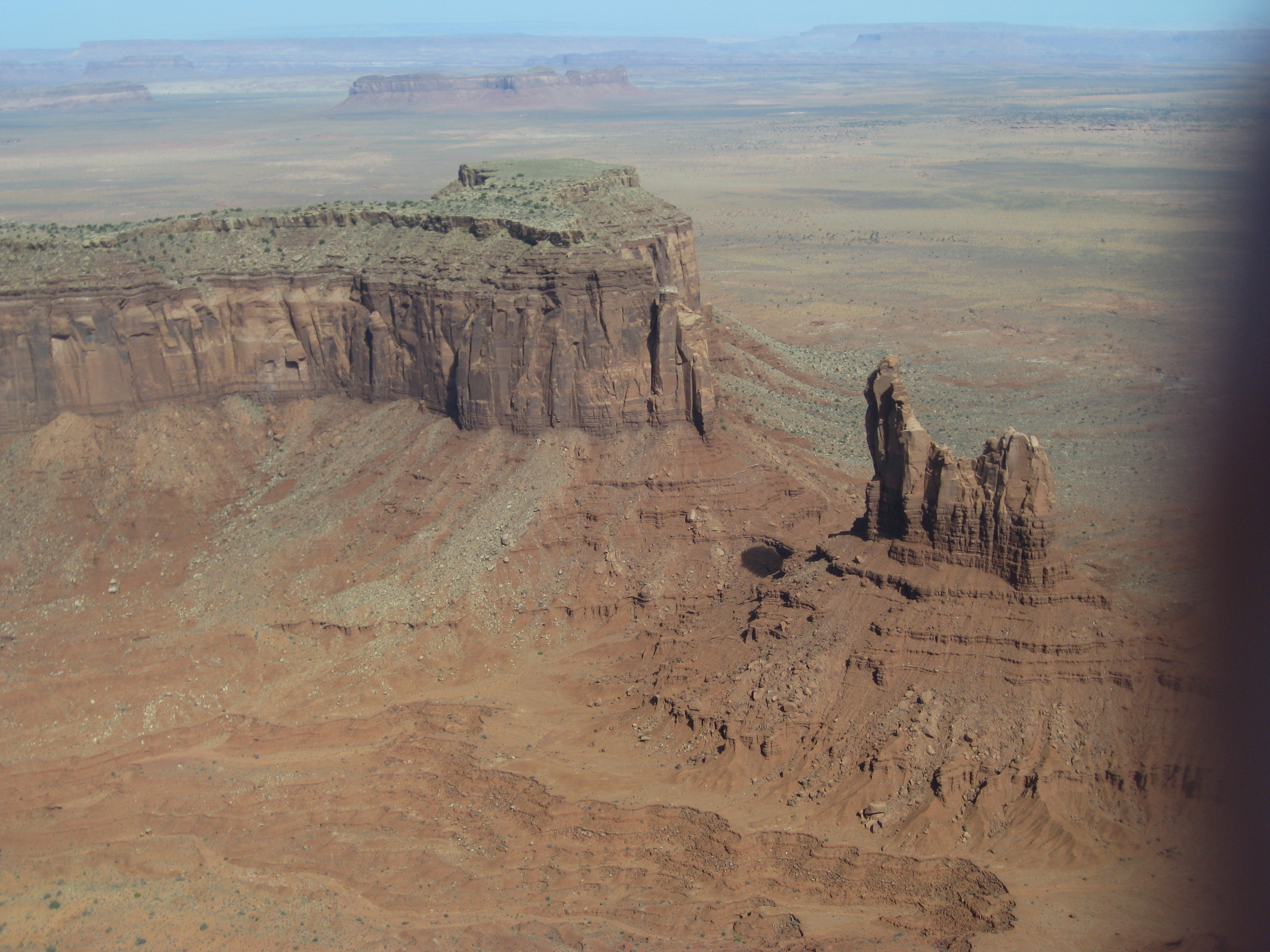
Aerial view of Setting Hen (right) with Eagle Mesa (center left)

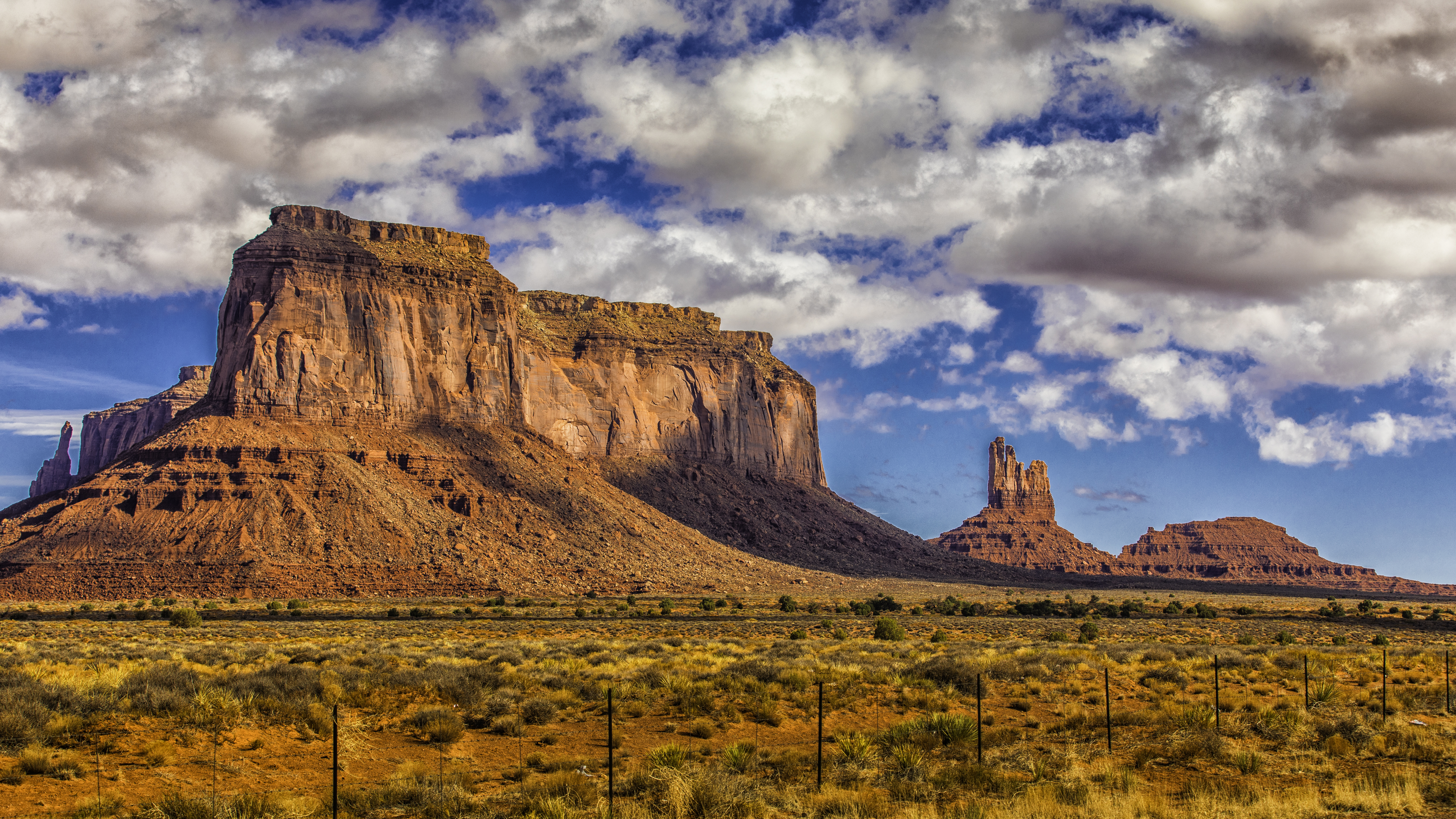
Eagle Mesa (left), Setting Hen (right)

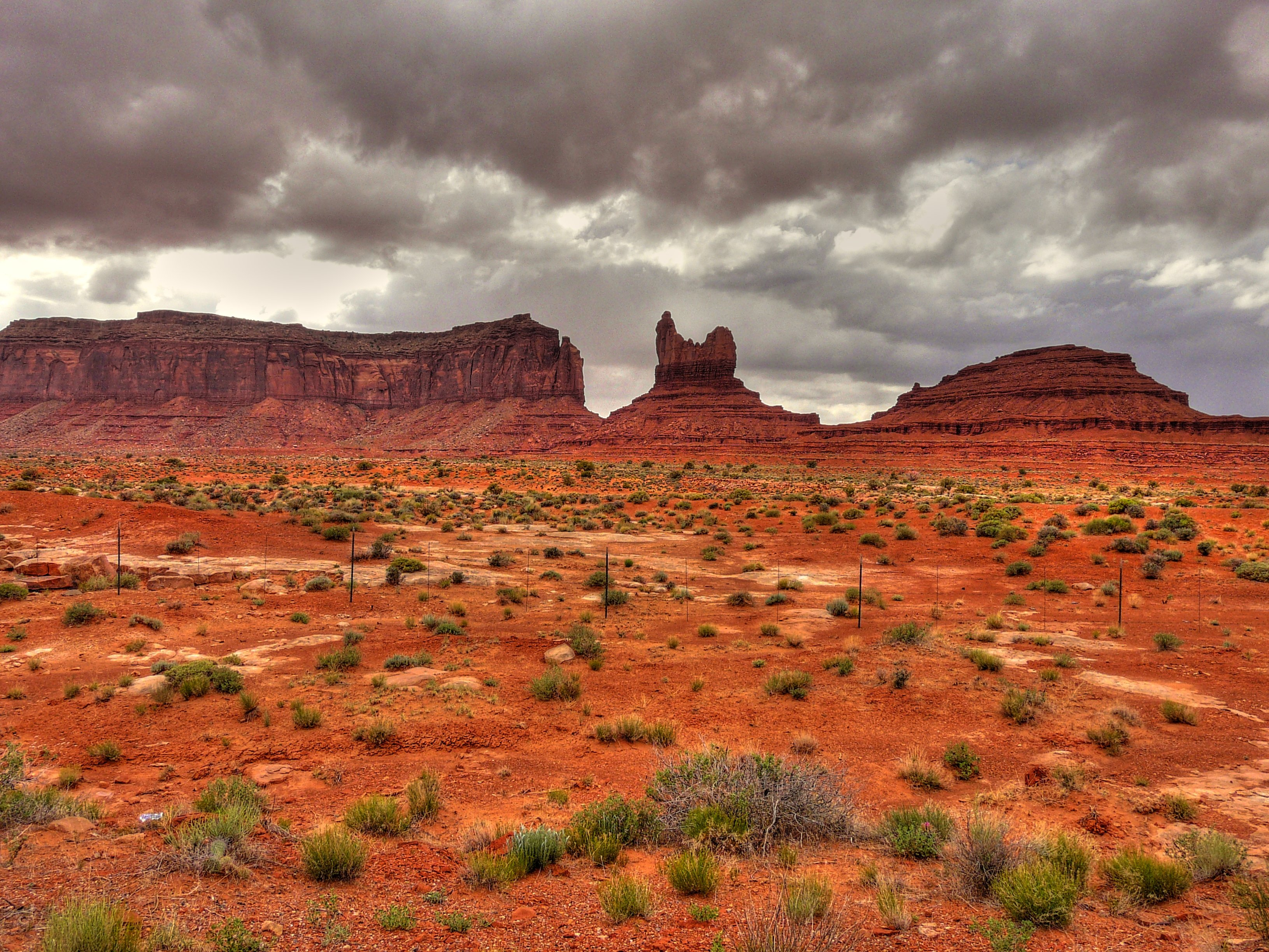
Setting Hen centered

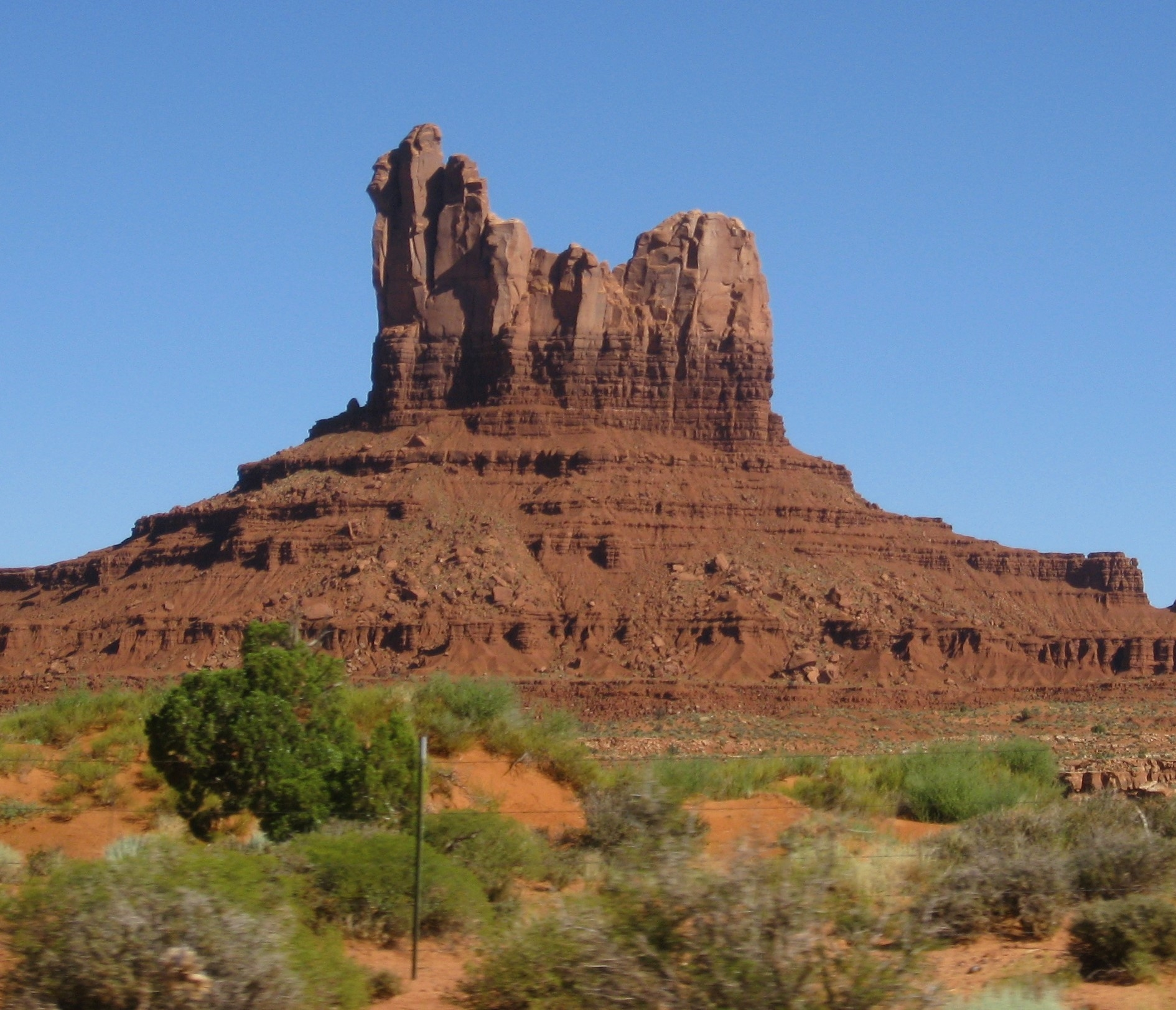

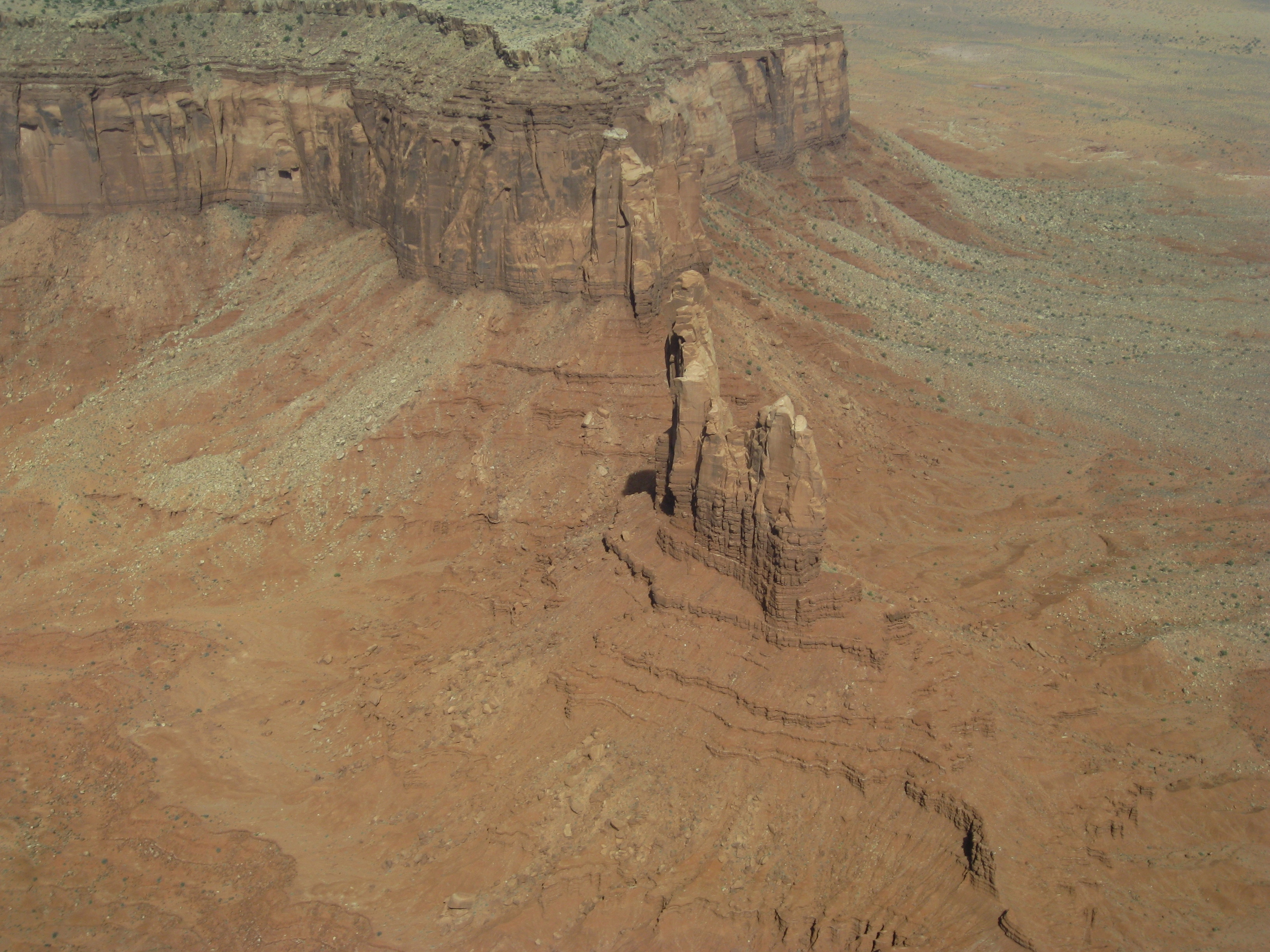
Aerial view

== See also ==
- List of mountains of Utah
- List of appearances of Monument Valley in the media
