= Brighams Tomb =

Mesa in San Juan County, Utah, United States

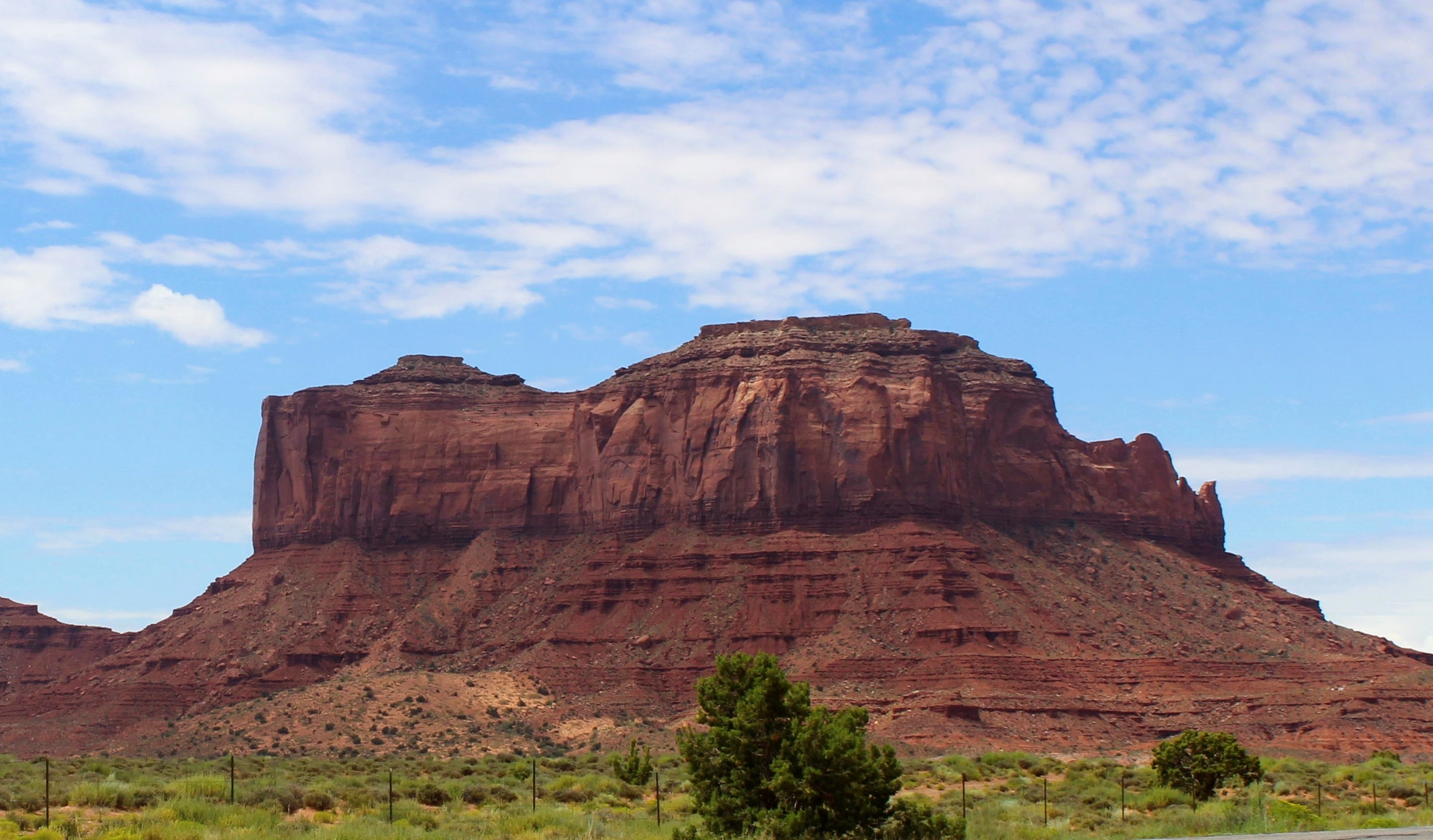
- North aspect

Highest point
- Elevation: 6,739 ft (2,054 m)
- Prominence: 1,225 ft (373 m)
- Parent peak: Agathla Peak (7,099 ft)
- Isolation: 16.59 mi (26.70 km)
- Coordinates: 37°02′46″N 110°05′04″W

Naming
- Etymology: Brigham's Tomb

Geography
- Location within Utah Location within the United States
- Location: Monument Valley; San Juan County, Utah, U.S.
- Parent range: Colorado Plateau
- Topo map: USGS Monument Pass

Geology
- Rock type: Sandstone

Climbing
- Easiest route: class 5.x climbing

Brighams Tomb is a 6,739-foot-elevation (2,054-meter) summit in San Juan County, Utah, United States.

== Description ==
Brighams Tomb is situated six miles (9.7 km) northeast of Oljato–Monument Valley, Utah, on Navajo Nation land. It is an iconic landform of Monument Valley and can be seen from Highway 163. Precipitation runoff from this landform's slopes drains into the San Juan River drainage basin. Topographic relief is significant as the summit rises 1,000 feet (305 meters) above the surrounding terrain in 0.25 mile (0.4 km). The mountain's name refers to Brigham Young, the first governor of the Utah Territory. This landform's toponym was officially adopted/revised in 1988 by the United States Board on Geographic Names after having been officially named "Saddleback" from 1964 through 1987. Some older maps will still show the Saddleback name.

== Geology ==
Brighams Tomb is composed of three principal strata. The bottom layer is slope-forming Organ Rock Shale, the next stratum is cliff-forming De Chelly Sandstone, and the upper layer is Moenkopi Formation capped by Shinarump Conglomerate. The rock ranges in age from Permian at the bottom to Late Triassic at the top. The buttes and mesas of Monument Valley are the result of the Organ Rock Shale being more easily eroded than the overlaying sandstone.

== Climate ==
Spring and fall are the most favorable seasons to visit Brighams Tomb. According to the Köppen climate classification system, it is located in a semi-arid climate zone with cold winters and hot summers. Summers average 54 days above 90 °F (32 °C) annually, and highs rarely exceed 100 °F (38 °C). Summer nights are comfortably cool, and temperatures drop quickly after sunset. Winters are cold, but daytime highs are usually above freezing. Winter temperatures below 0 °F (−18 °C) are uncommon, though possible. This desert climate receives less than 10 inches (250 millimeters) of annual rainfall, and snowfall is generally light during the winter.

== Gallery ==
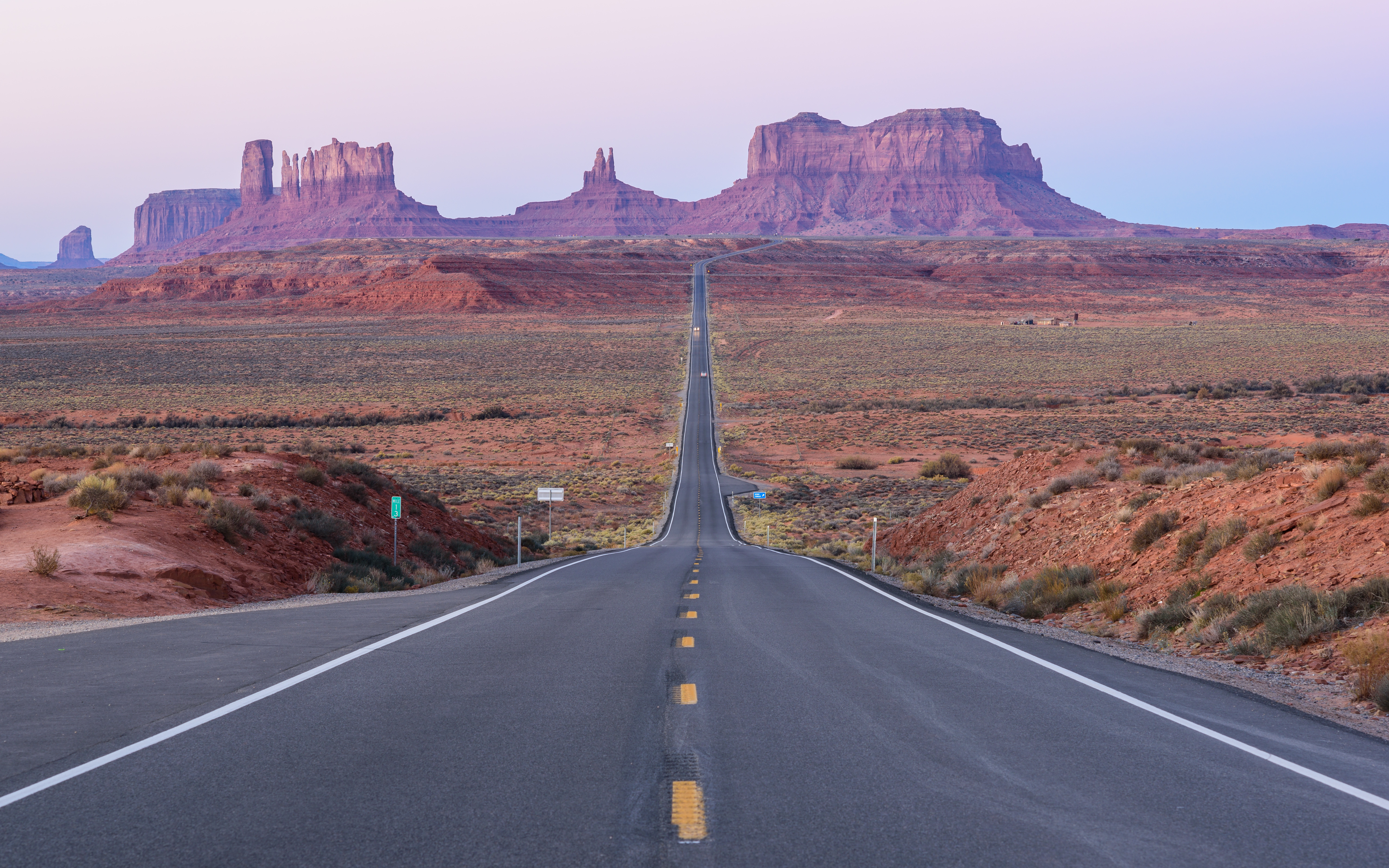
Brighams Tomb to the right, looking southwest from Highway 163.
Forrest Gump was here. (culmination of cross-country running scene)

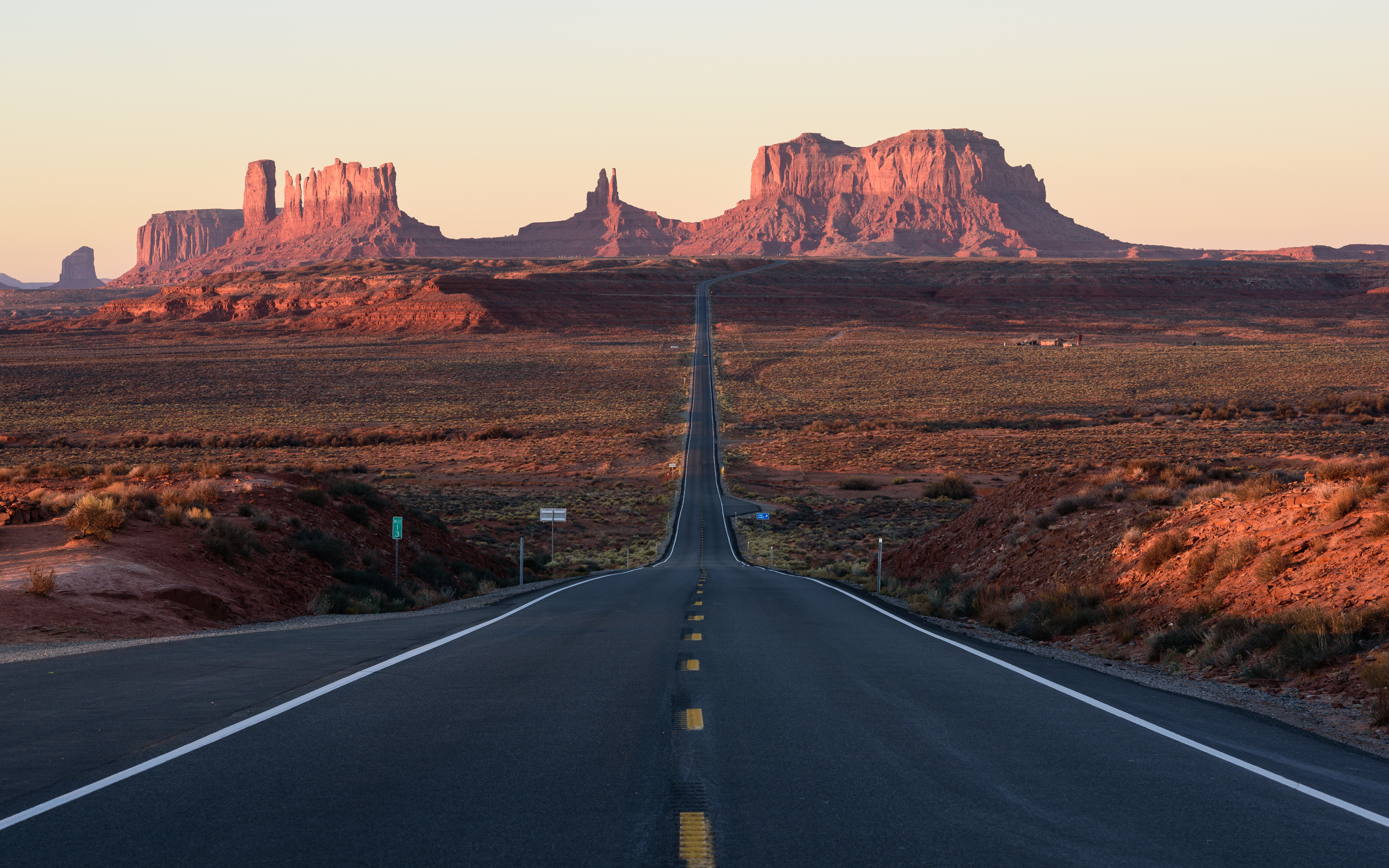
Brighams Tomb to the right

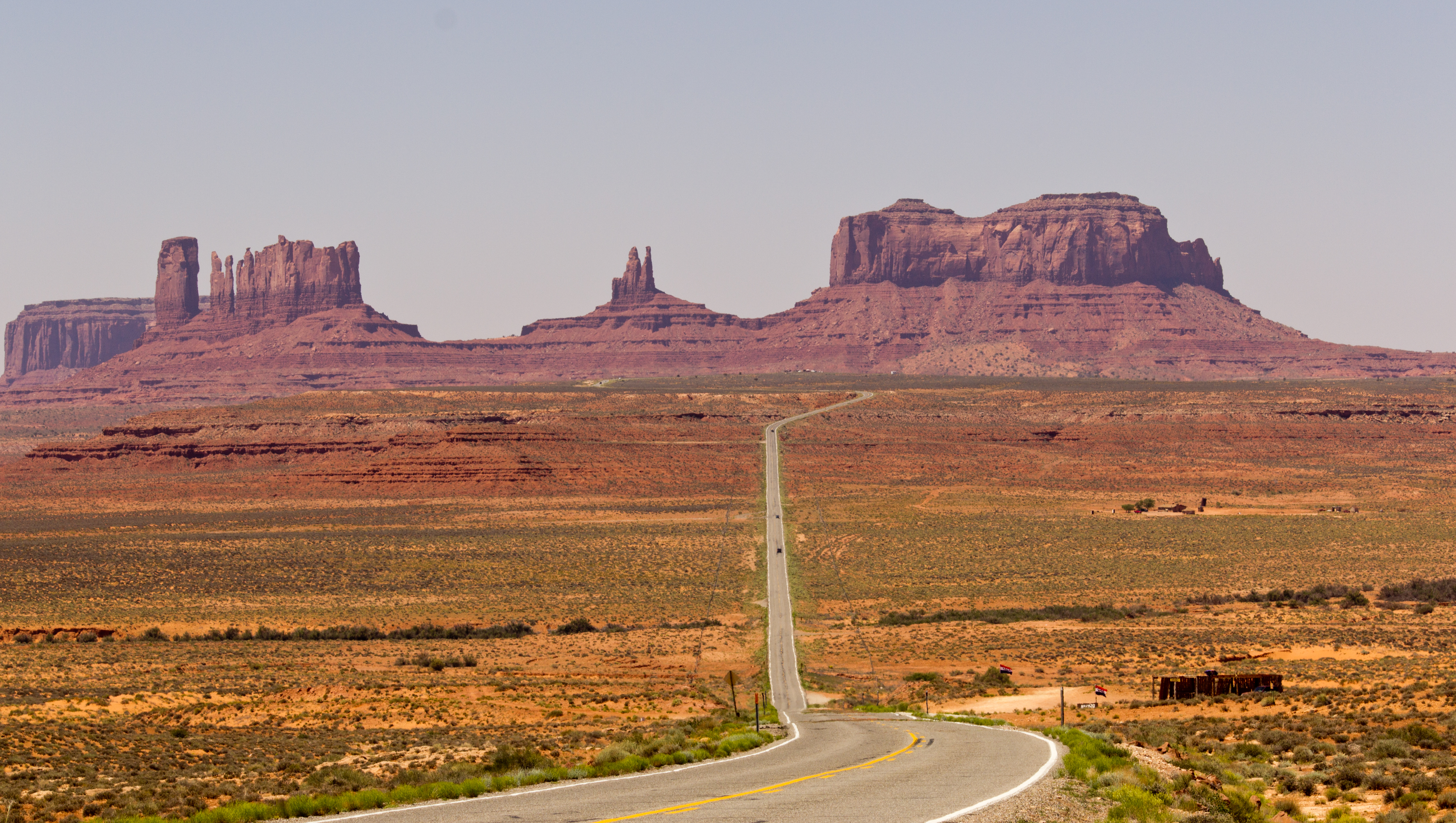
Brighams Tomb to the right

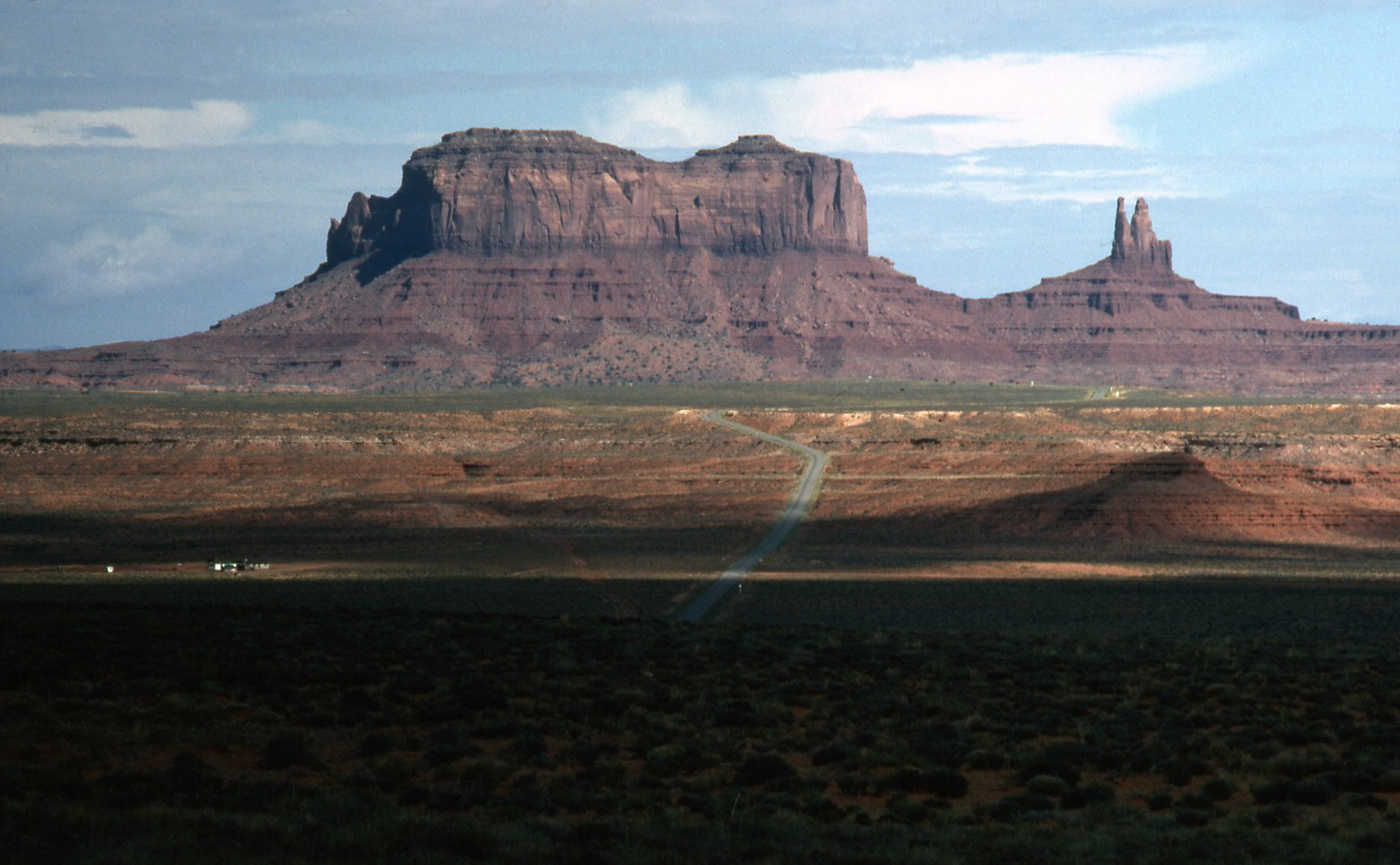
Southwest aspect, with King-on-his-Throne to right

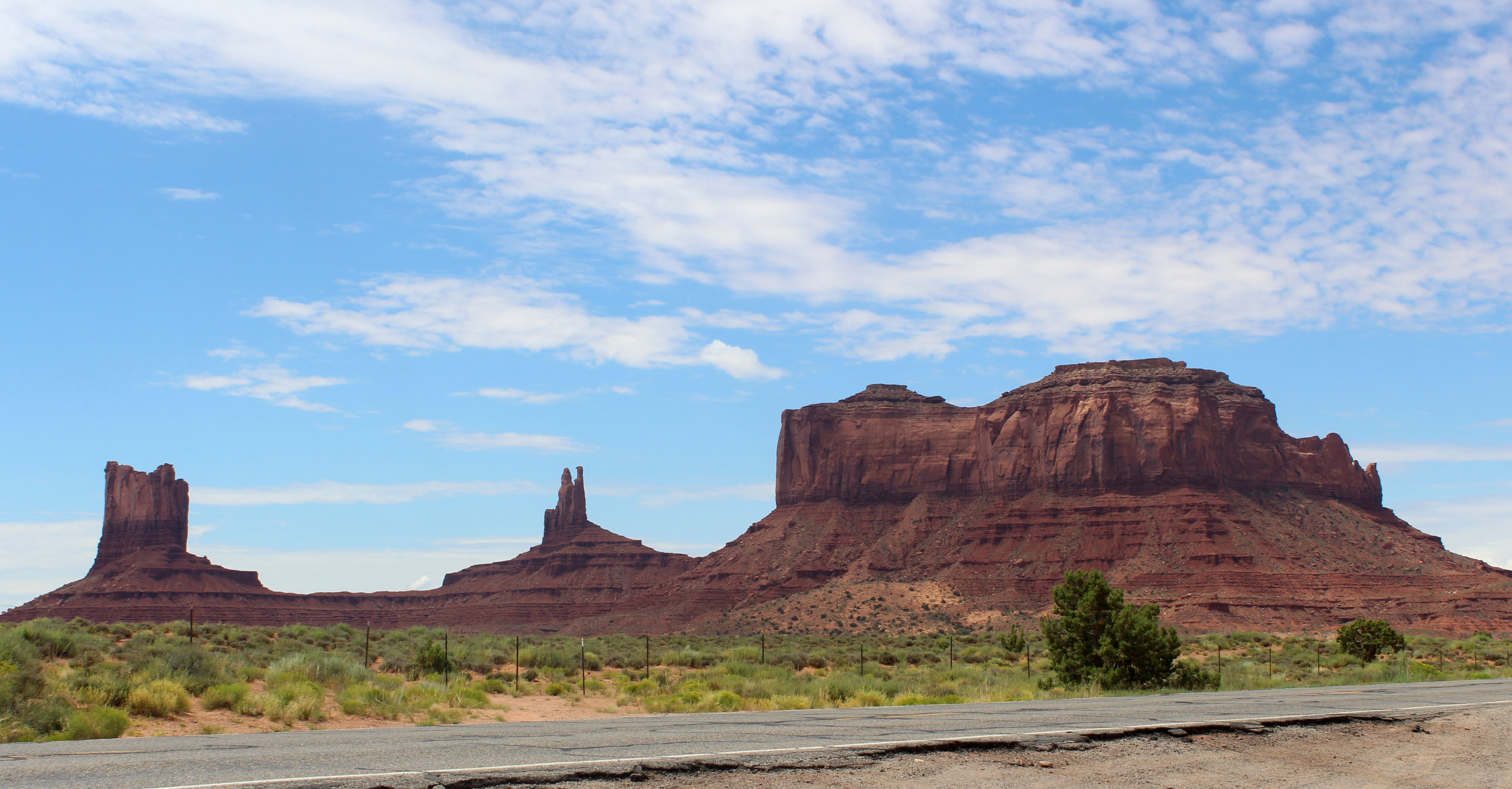
Brighams Tomb to the right

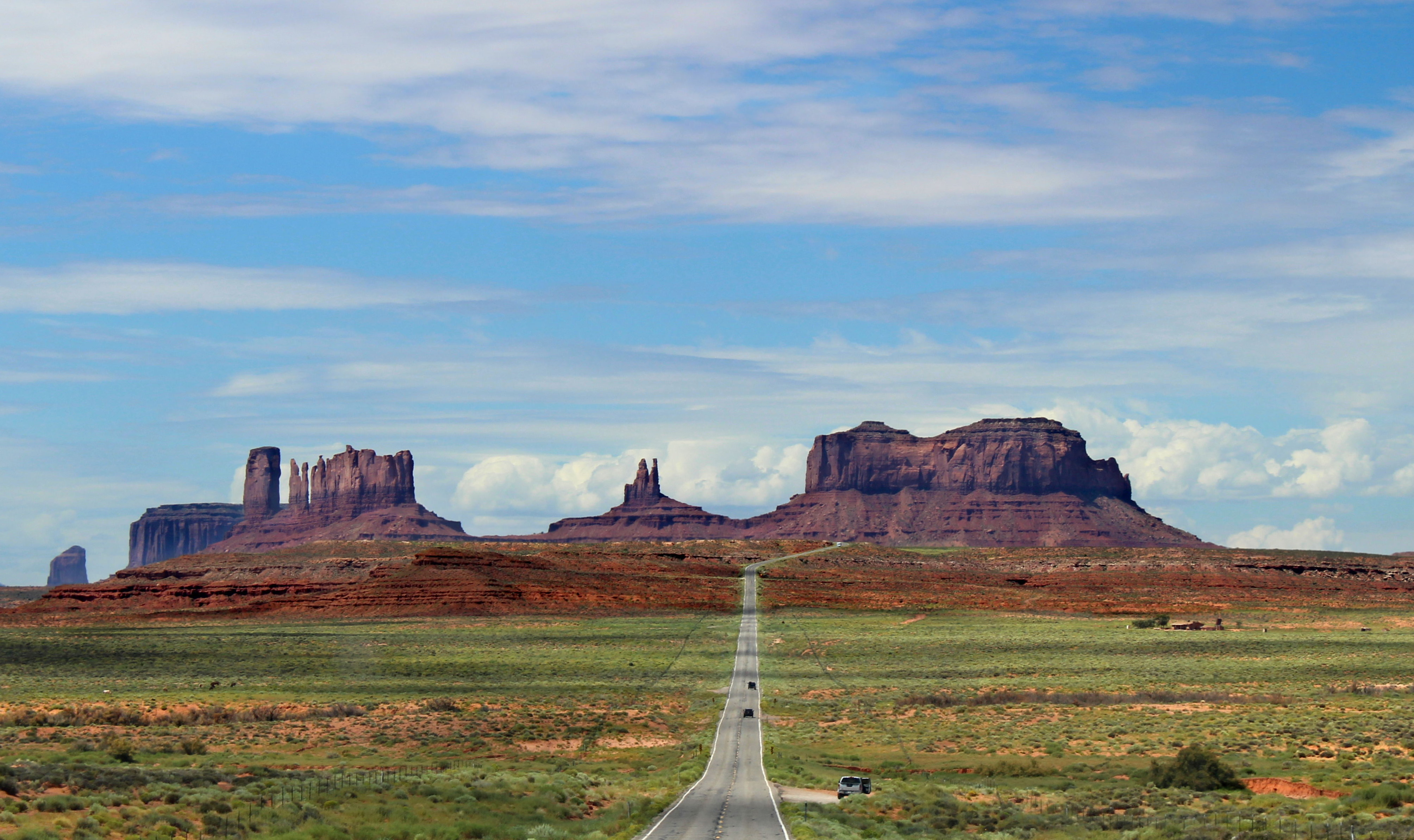
Brighams Tomb to the right

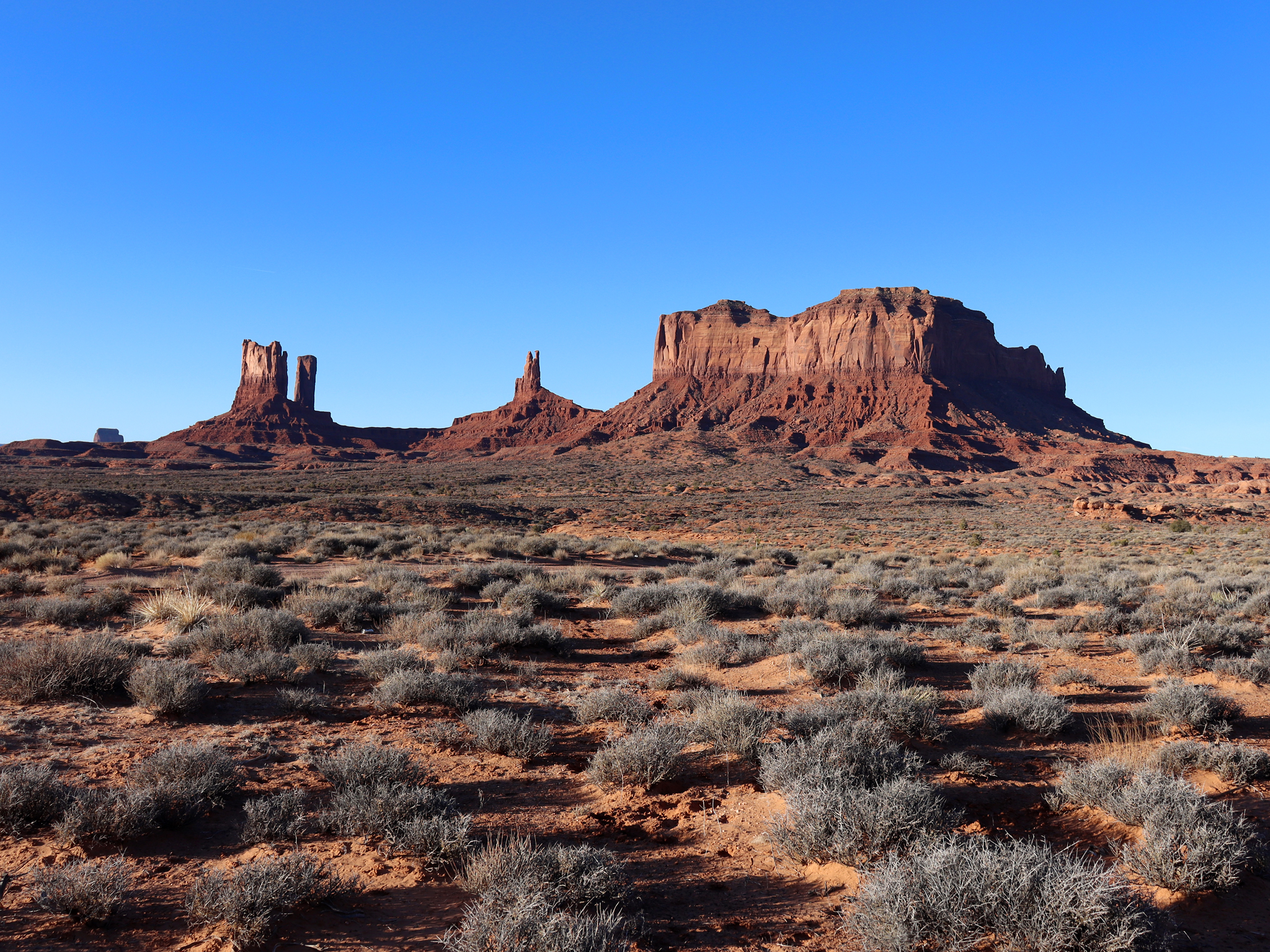
Brighams Tomb to the right

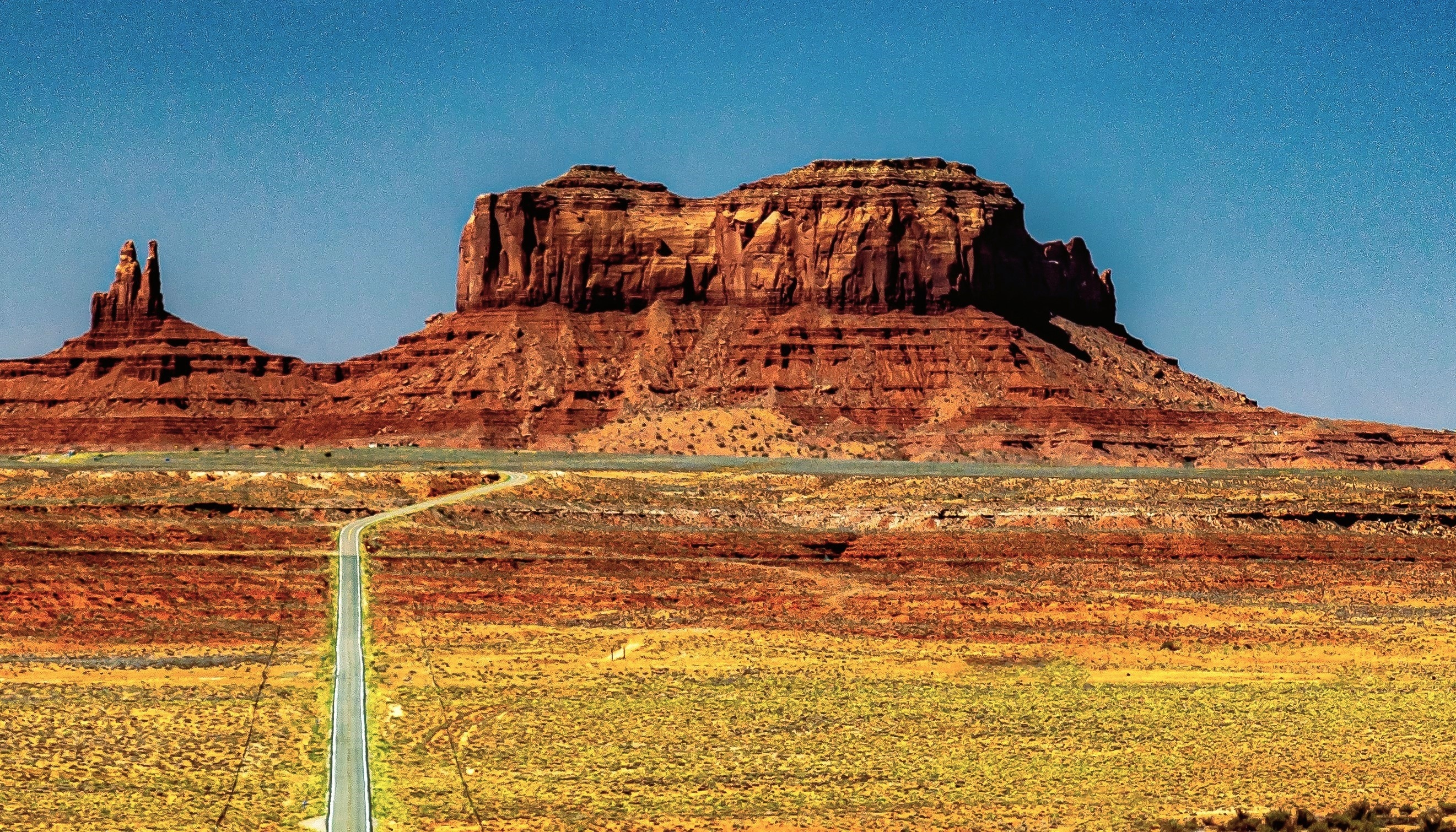
Northeast aspect

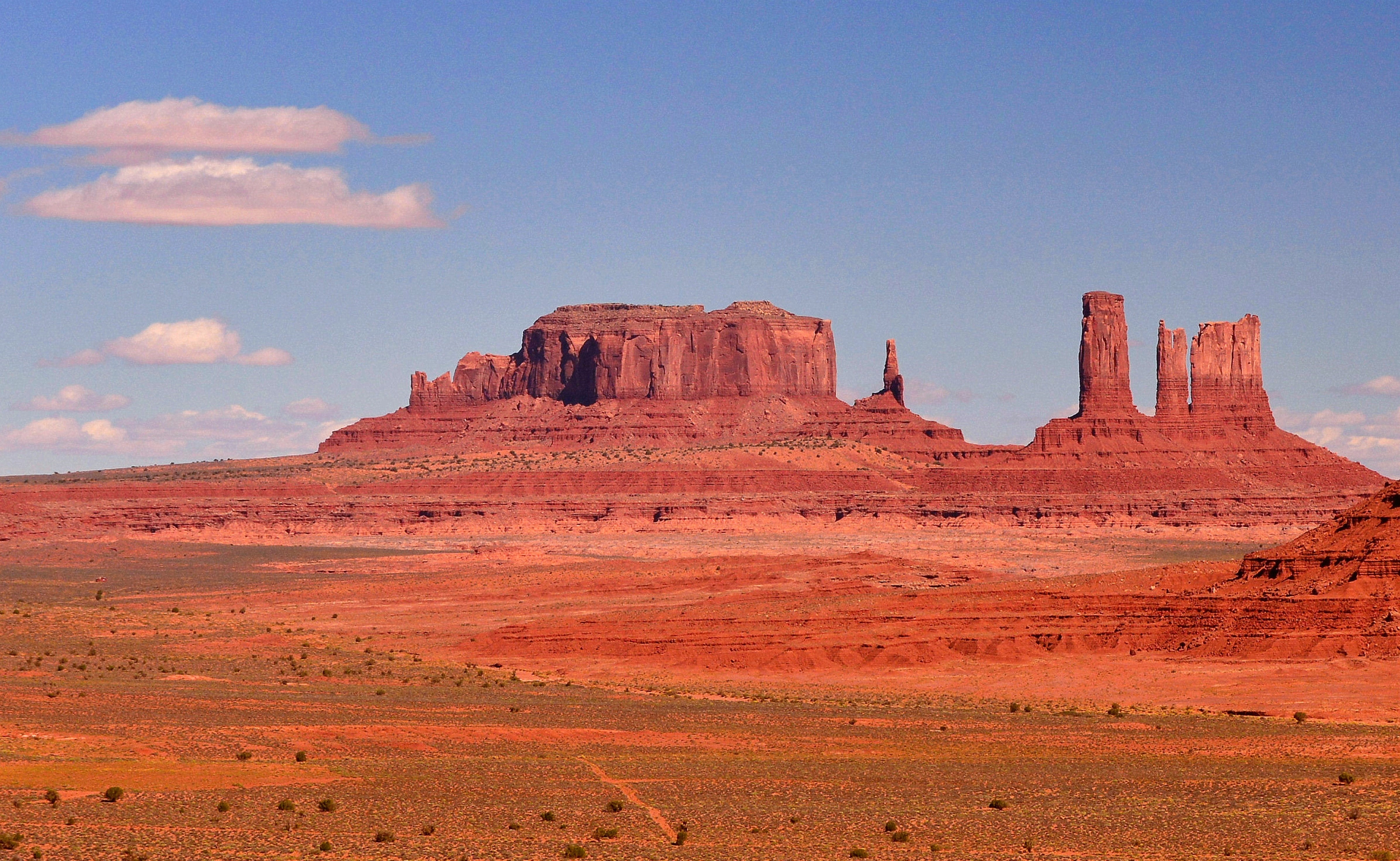
South aspect of Brighams Tomb (centered) and Castle Rock (right) viewed from North Window Overlook

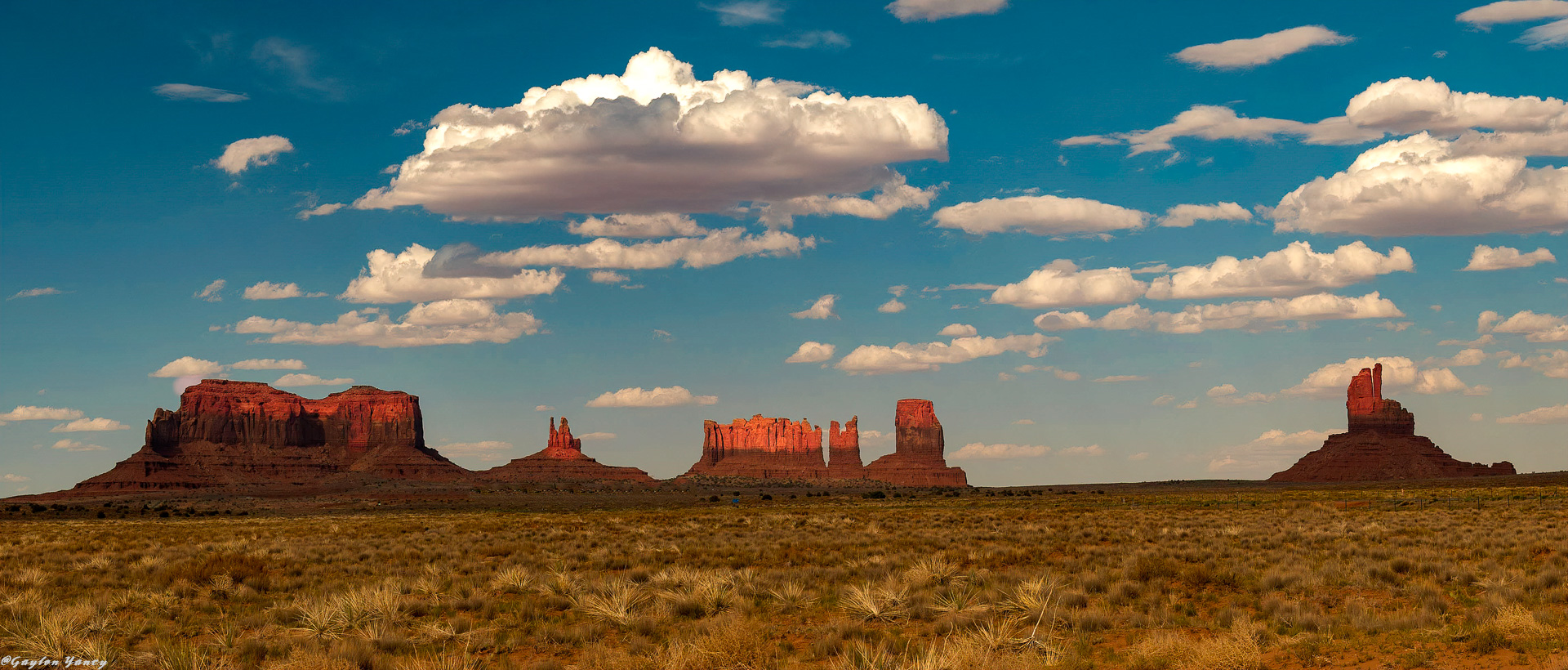
Brighams Tomb to the left

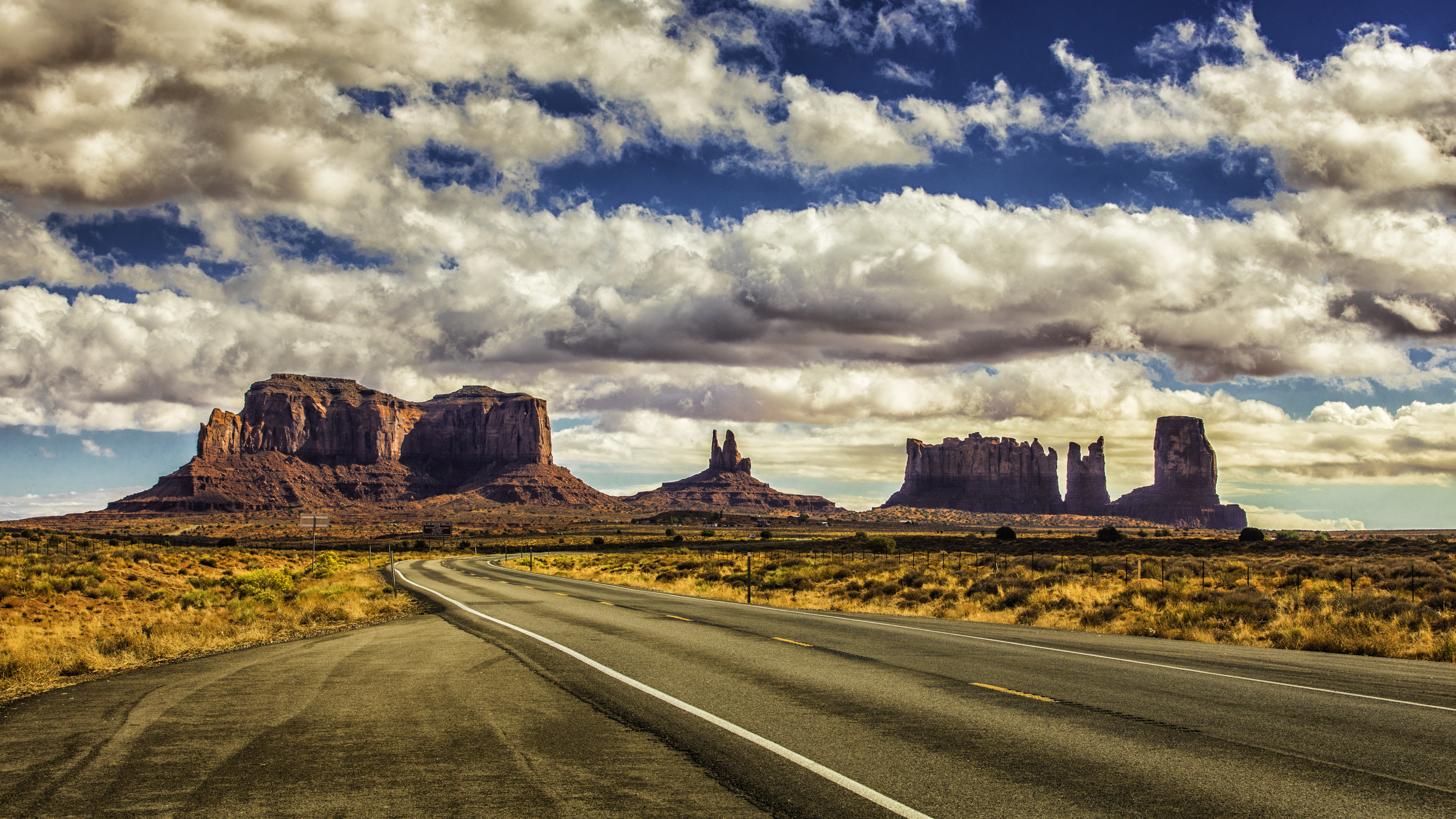
Brighams Tomb to the left

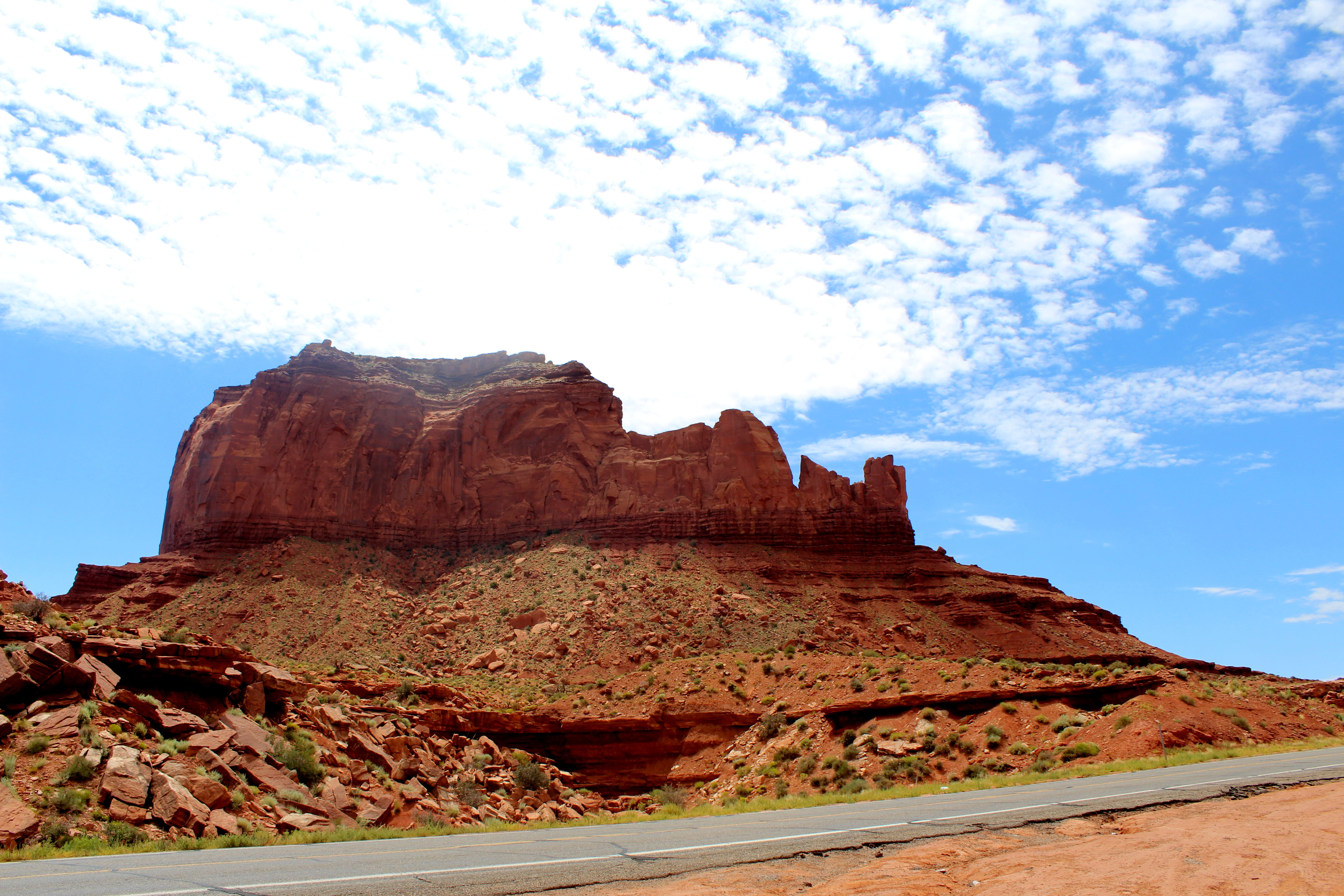
North aspect

== See also ==
- List of mountains of Utah
- List of appearances of Monument Valley in the media
