= Stagecoach (San Juan County, Utah) =

Butte in San Juan County, Utah, United States

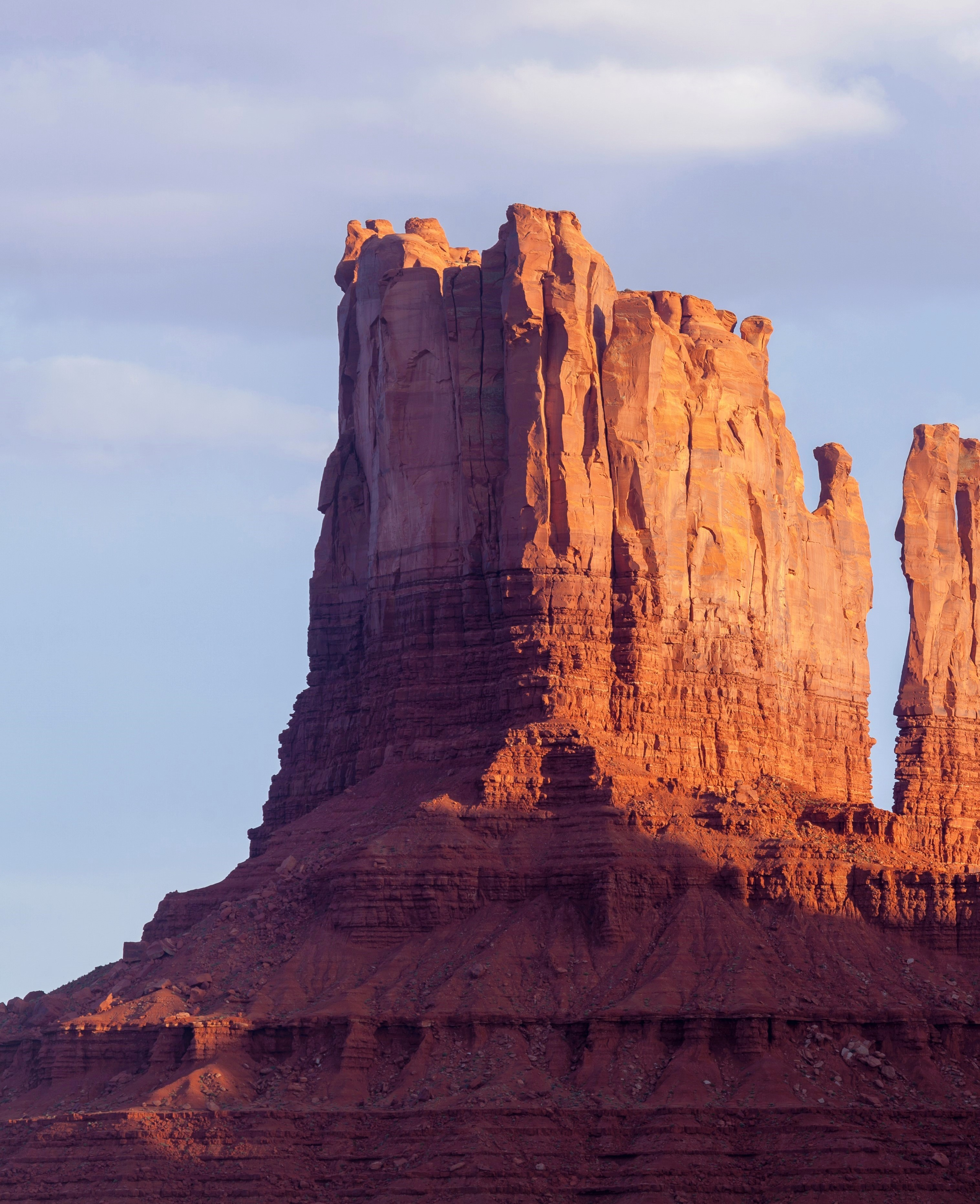
- North aspect

Highest point
- Elevation: 6,302 ft (1,921 m)
- Prominence: 322 ft (98 m)
- Parent peak: Castle Rock (6,340 ft)
- Isolation: 0.3 mi (0.48 km)
- Coordinates: 37°02′11″N 110°04′22″W

Geography
- Location within Utah Location within the United States
- Location: Monument Valley; San Juan County, Utah, U.S.
- Parent range: Colorado Plateau
- Topo map: USGS Monument Pass

Geology
- Rock age: Permian
- Mountain type: Butte
- Rock type: Sandstone

Climbing
- First ascent: 1995

Stagecoach is a 6,302-foot-elevation (1,921-meter) summit in San Juan County, Utah, United States.

== Description ==
Stagecoach is situated 4.4 miles (7.1 km) north-northeast of the Monument Valley Tribal Park Visitor Center, on Navajo Nation land. It is an iconic landform of Monument Valley and can be seen from Highway 163. Precipitation runoff from this landform's slopes drains into the San Juan River drainage basin. Topographic relief is significant as the summit rises 900 feet (274 meters) above the surrounding terrain in 0.35 mile (0.56 km). This landform's toponym has been officially adopted by the United States Board on Geographic Names. It is so named because the butte resembles a stagecoach. The first ascent of the summit was made in 1995 by John Middendorf, Carl Tobin, and Dan Langmade.

== Geology ==
Stagecoach is composed of two principal strata. The bottom layer is slope-forming Organ Rock Shale and the upper stratum is cliff-forming De Chelly Sandstone. The rock was deposited during the Permian period. The buttes and mesas of Monument Valley are the result of the Organ Rock Shale being more easily eroded than the overlaying sandstone.

== Climate ==
Spring and fall are the most favorable seasons to visit the Stagecoach. According to the Köppen climate classification system, it is located in a semi-arid climate zone with cold winters and hot summers. Summers average 54 days above 90 °F (32 °C) annually, and highs rarely exceed 100 °F (38 °C). Summer nights are comfortably cool, and temperatures drop quickly after sunset. Winters are cold, but daytime highs are usually above freezing. Winter temperatures below 0 °F (−18 °C) are uncommon, though possible. This desert climate receives less than 10 inches (250 millimeters) of annual rainfall, and snowfall is generally light during the winter.

== Gallery ==
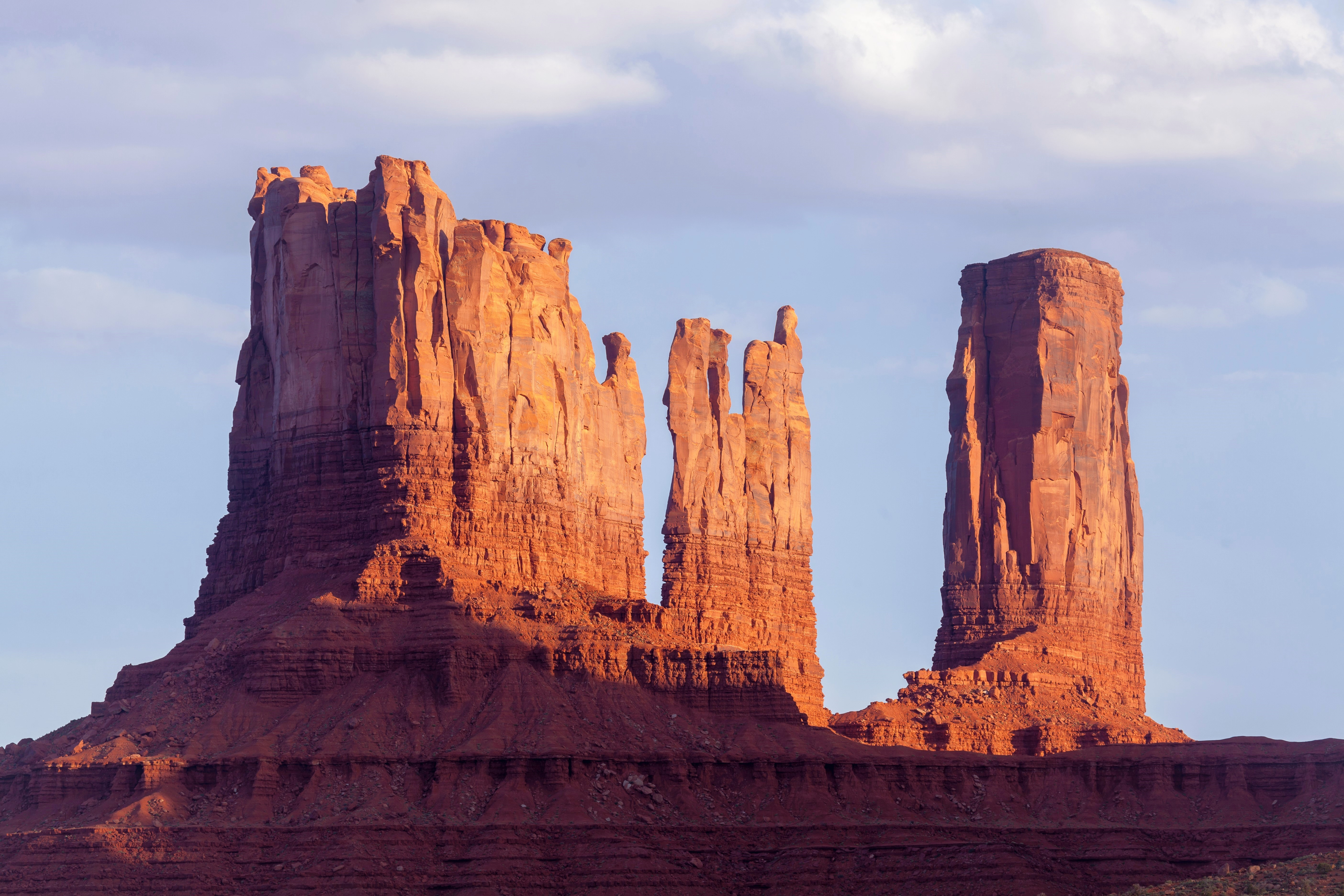
Stagecoach (left), Bear and Rabbit, Castle Rock

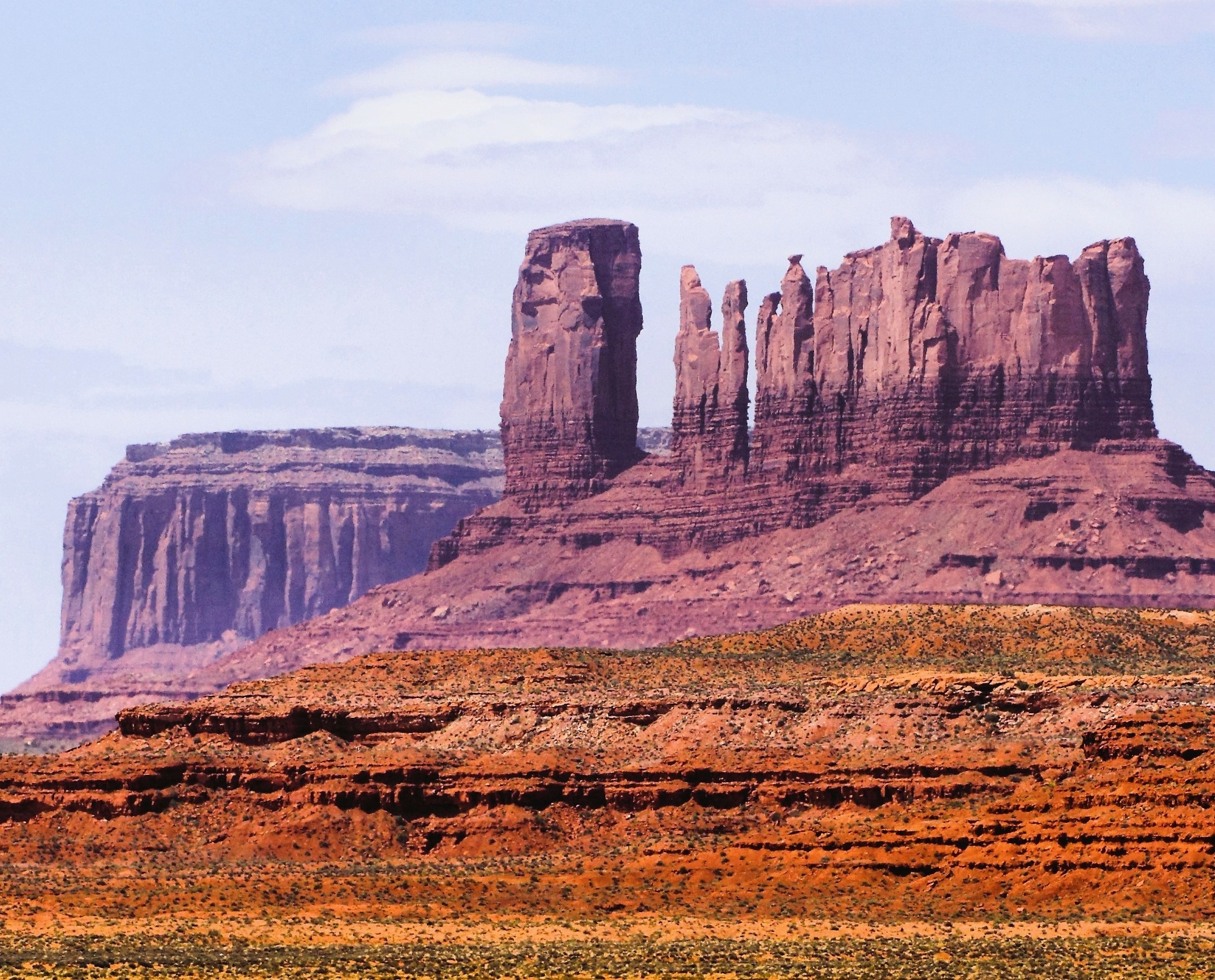
Northeast aspect of Castle Rock (centered) and Stagecoach (right).

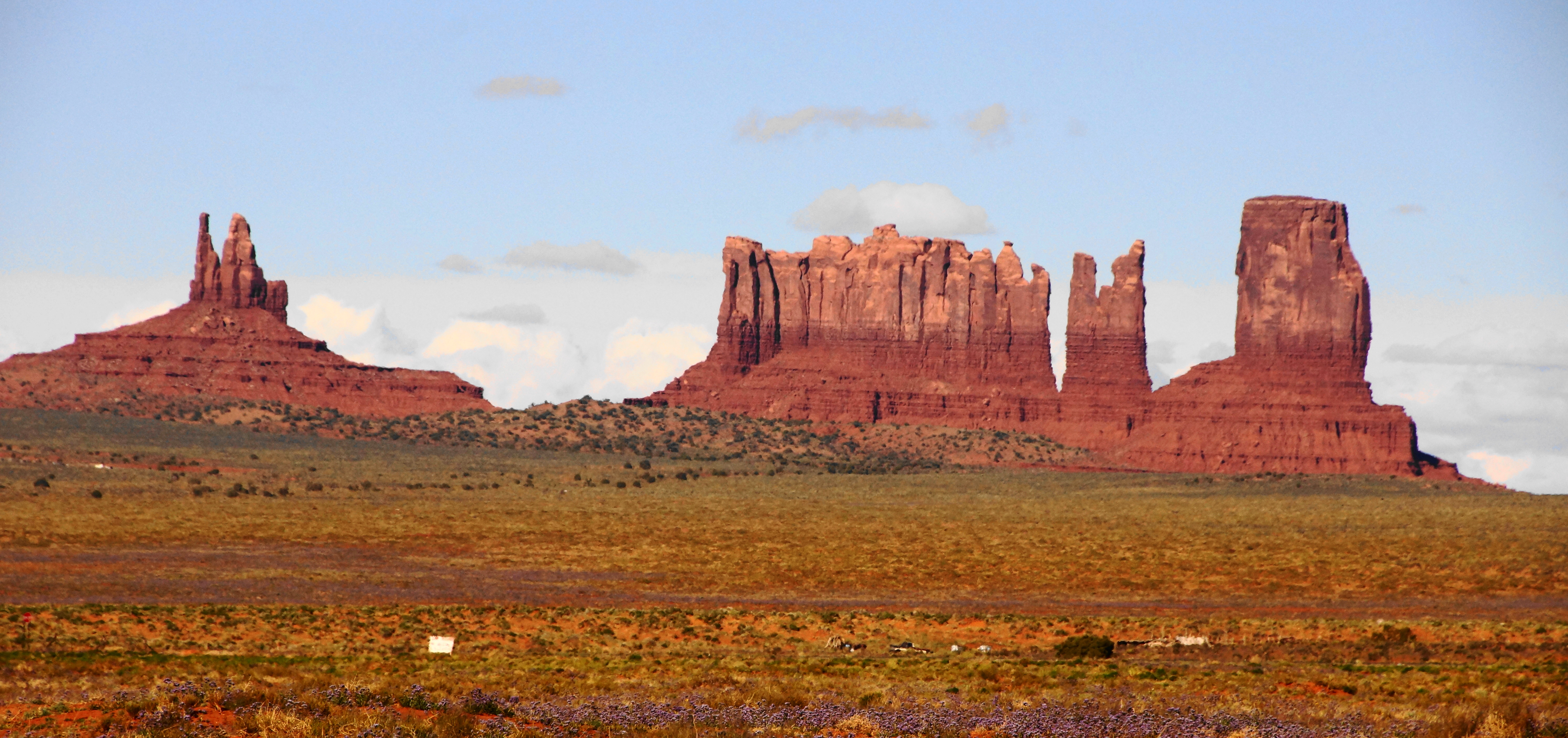
L→R: King-on-his-Throne, Stagecoach, Bear and Rabbit, Castle Rock

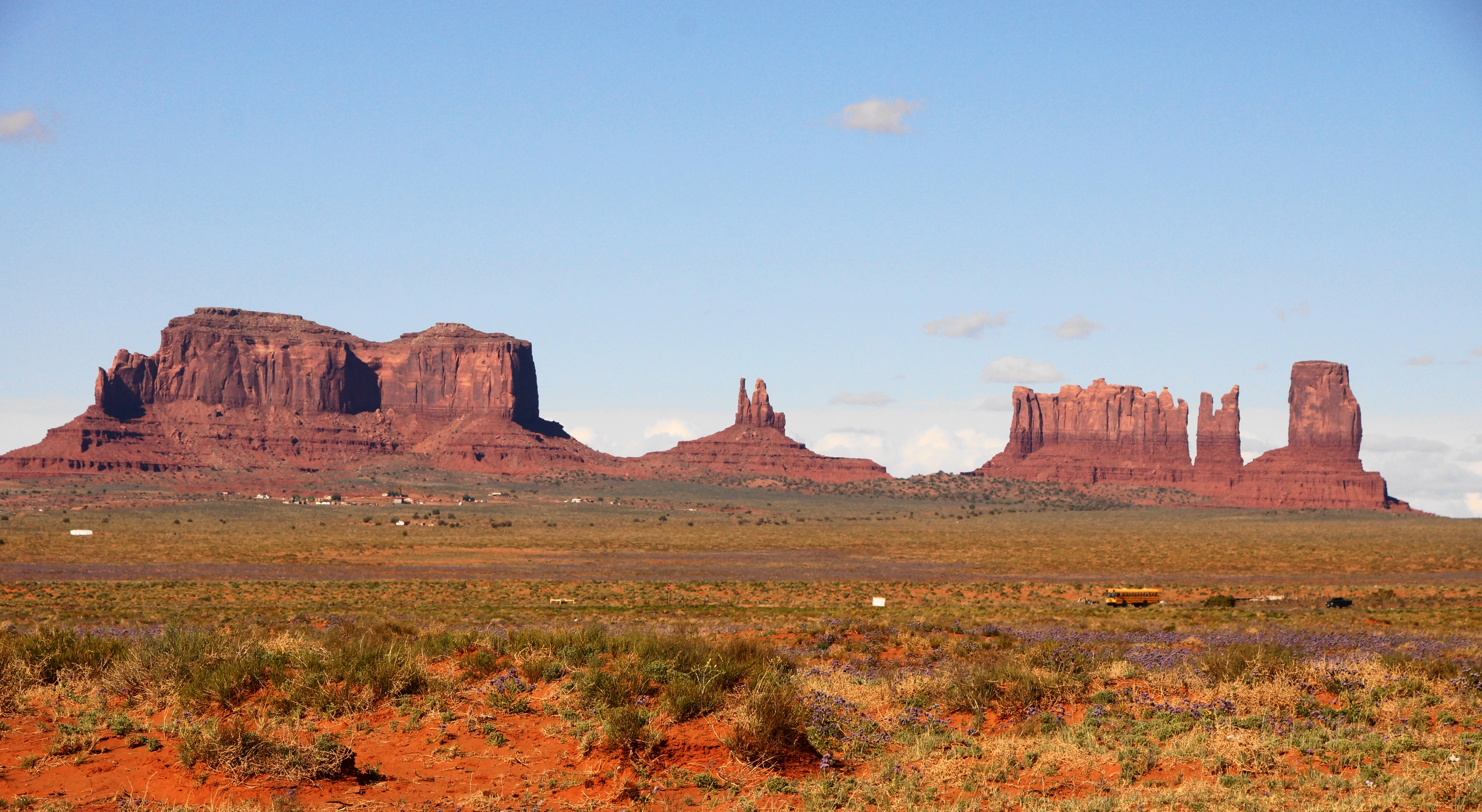
L→R: Brighams Tomb, King-on-his-Throne, Stagecoach, Bear and Rabbit, Castle Rock

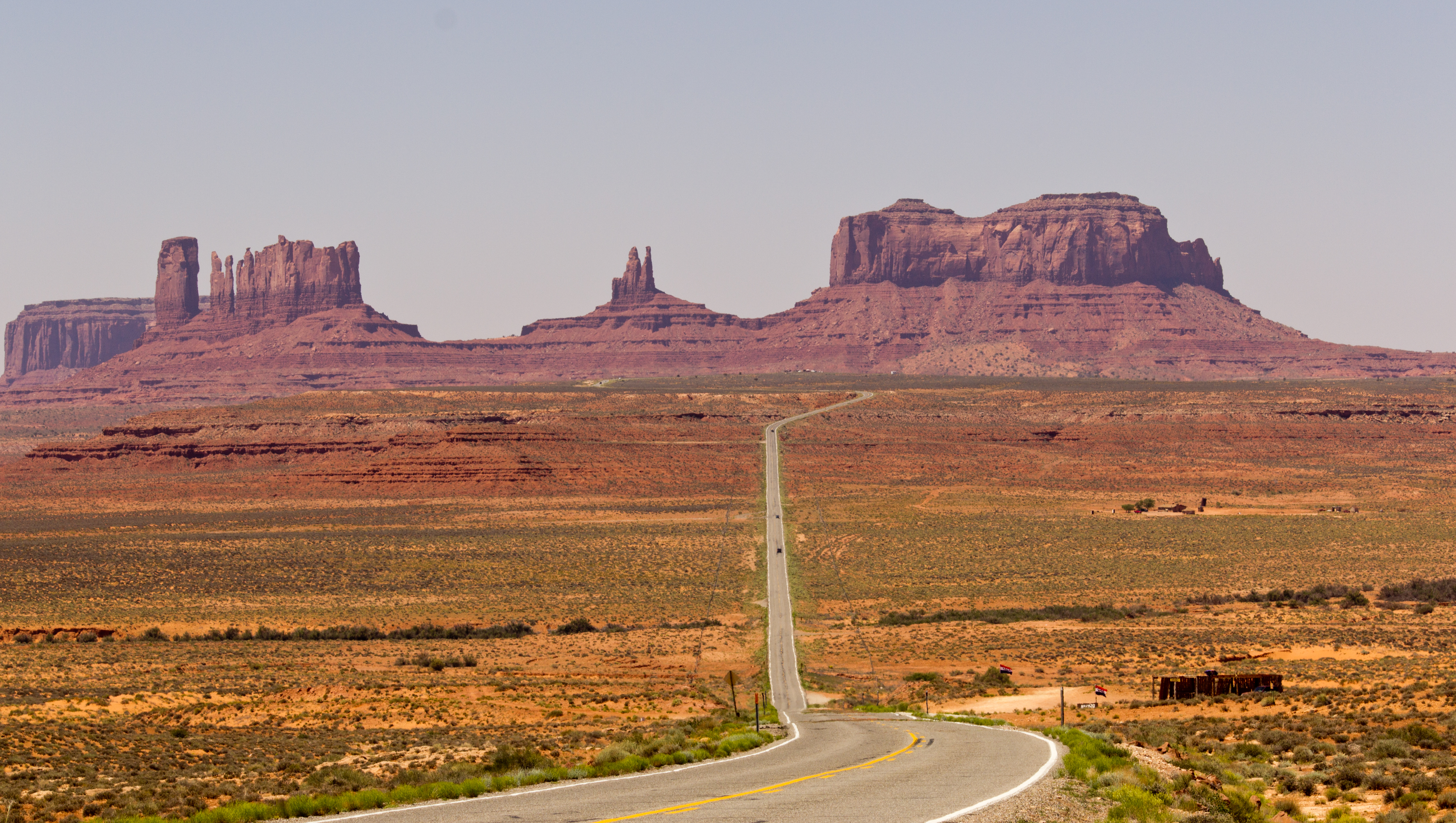
Castle Rock left, Stagecoach, King-on-his-Throne (center) Brighams Tomb to right.
View looking southwest from Highway 163.
Forrest Gump was here. (culmination of cross-country running scene)

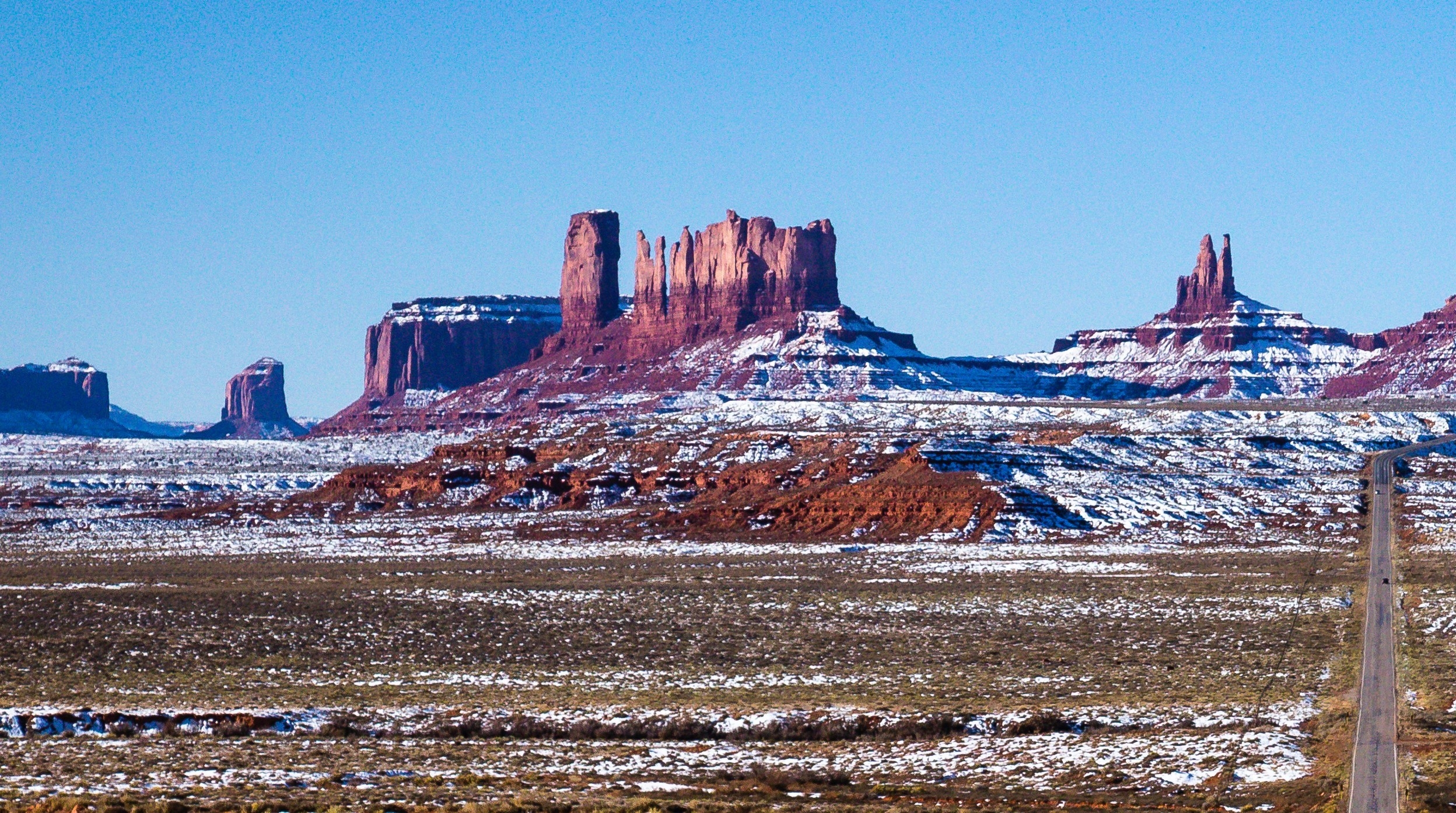
Stagecoach centered

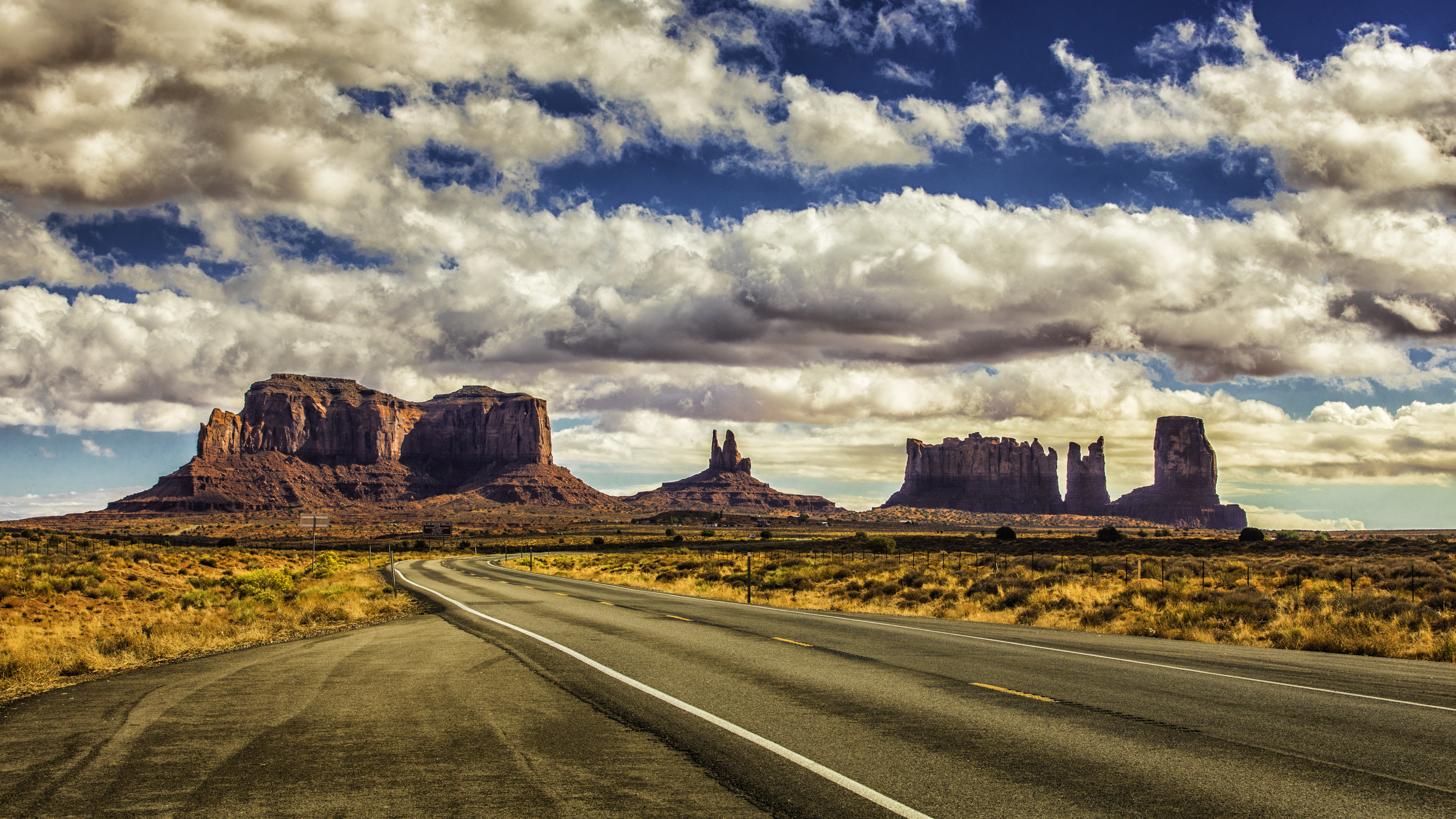
L→R: Brighams Tomb, King-on-his-Throne, Stagecoach, Bear and Rabbit, Castle Rock

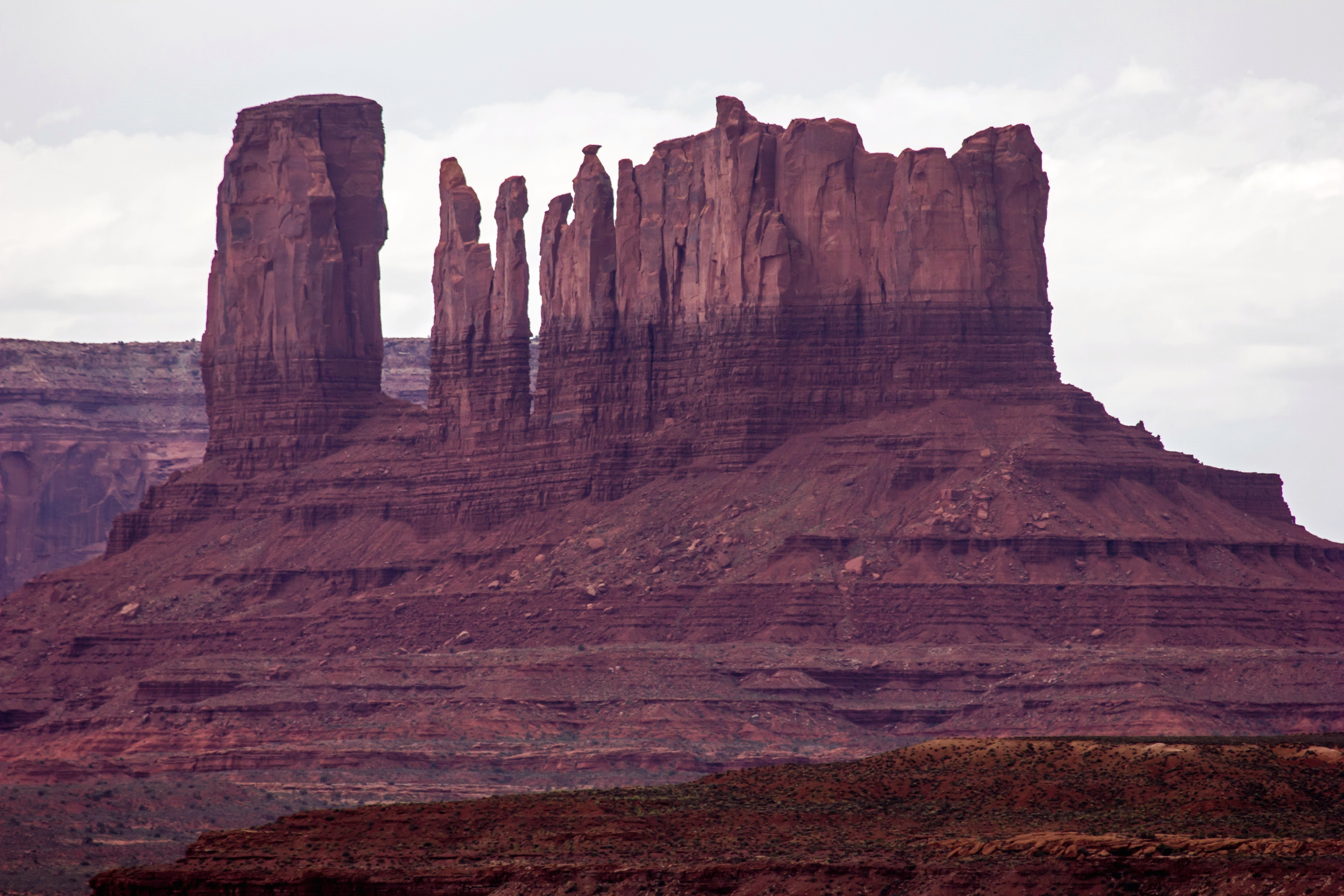
Northeast aspect of Castle Rock (left), Bear and Rabbit, and Stagecoach

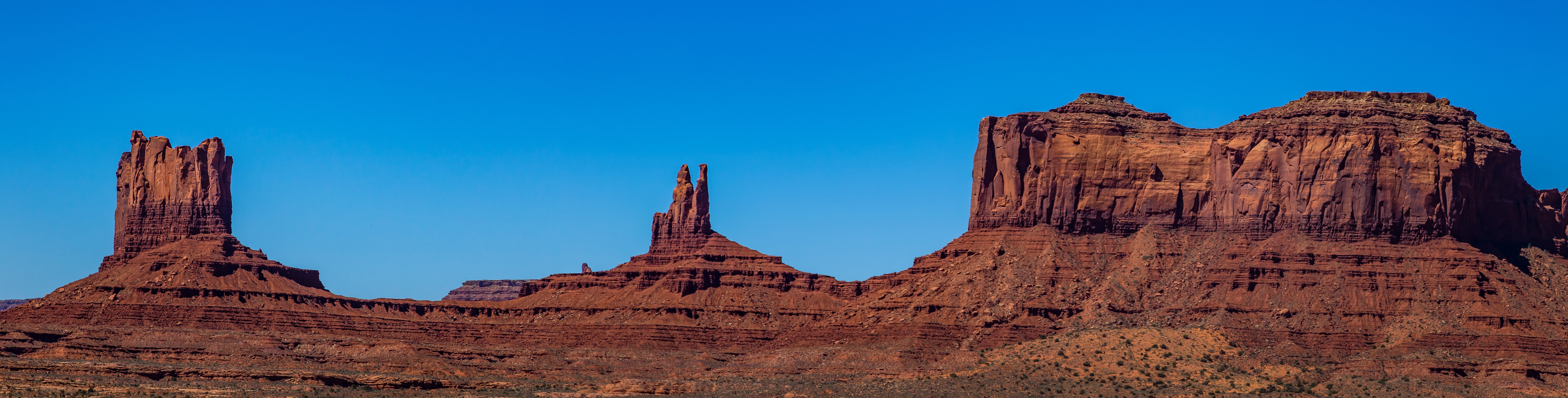
L→R: Stagecoach, King-on-his-Throne, Brighams Tomb

== See also ==
- List of mountains of Utah
- List of appearances of Monument Valley in the media
