= Castle Rock (San Juan County, Utah) =

Butte in San Juan County, Utah, United States

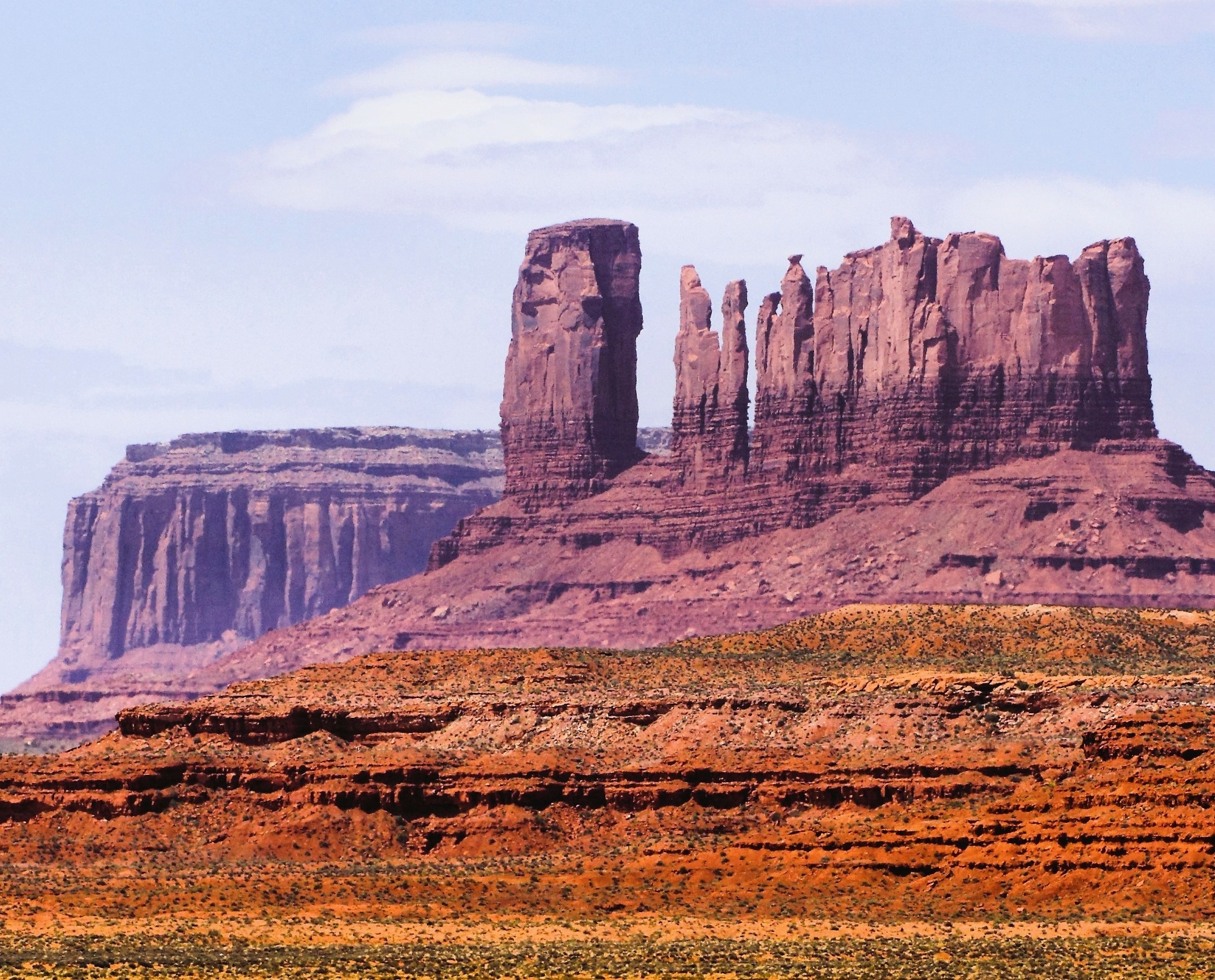
- Northeast aspect, centered (Stagecoach to the right)

Highest point
- Elevation: 6,340 ft (1,932 m)
- Prominence: 520 ft (158 m)
- Parent peak: Brighams Tomb (6,739 ft)
- Isolation: 1.1 mi (1.8 km)
- Coordinates: 37°01′57″N 110°04′27″W

Geography
- Location within Utah Location within the United States
- Location: Monument Valley; San Juan County, Utah, U.S.
- Parent range: Colorado Plateau
- Topo map: USGS Monument Pass

Geology
- Mountain type: Butte
- Rock type: Sandstone

Climbing
- First ascent: 1960
- Easiest route: class 5.10 climbing

Castle Rock is a 6,340-foot-elevation (1,932-meter) summit in San Juan County, Utah, United States.

== Description ==
Castle Rock is situated four miles (6.4 km) north-northeast of the Monument Valley Tribal Park Visitor Center, on Navajo Nation land. It is an iconic landform of Monument Valley and can be seen from Highway 163. Precipitation runoff from this landform's slopes drains into the San Juan River drainage basin. Topographic relief is significant as the summit rises 800 feet (244 meters) above the surrounding terrain in 0.25 mile (0.4 km). This landform's toponym has been officially adopted by the United States Board on Geographic Names. It is so named because the butte resembles the silhouette of a castle. The first ascent of the summit was made on May 8, 1960, by Harvey T. Carter, Layton Kor, and John Auld.

== Geology ==
Castle Rock is composed of three principal strata. The bottom layer is slope-forming Organ Rock Shale, the next stratum is cliff-forming De Chelly Sandstone, and the upper layer is Moenkopi Formation. The rock ranges in age from Permian at the bottom to Triassic at the top. The buttes and mesas of Monument Valley are the result of the Organ Rock Shale being more easily eroded than the overlaying sandstone.

== Climate ==
Spring and fall are the most favorable seasons to visit Castle Rock. According to the Köppen climate classification system, it is located in a semi-arid climate zone with cold winters and hot summers. Summers average 54 days above 90 °F (32 °C) annually, and highs rarely exceed 100 °F (38 °C). Summer nights are comfortably cool, and temperatures drop quickly after sunset. Winters are cold, but daytime highs are usually above freezing. Winter temperatures below 0 °F (−18 °C) are uncommon, though possible. This desert climate receives less than 10 inches (250 millimeters) of annual rainfall, and snowfall is generally light during the winter.

== Gallery ==
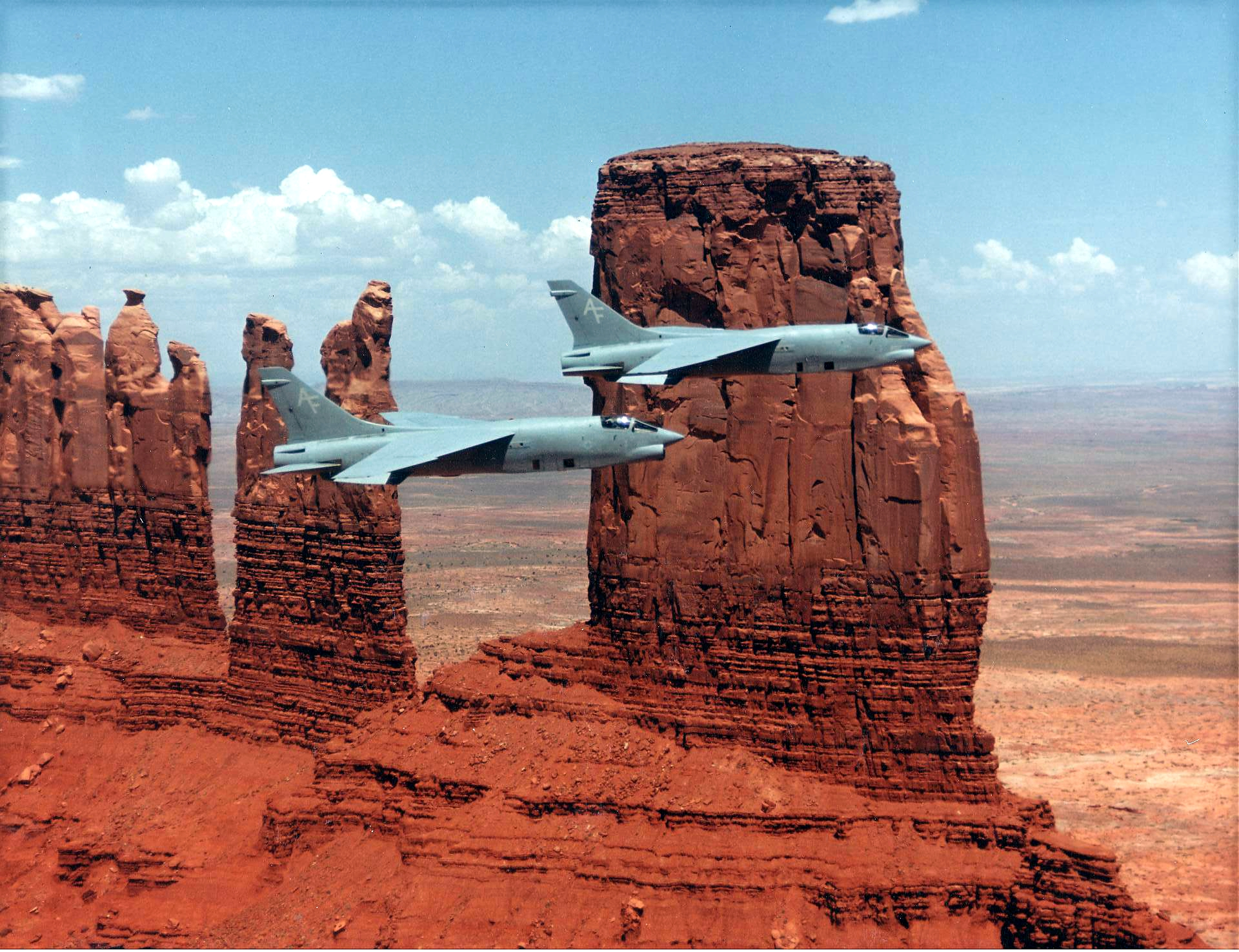
West aspect of Castle Rock

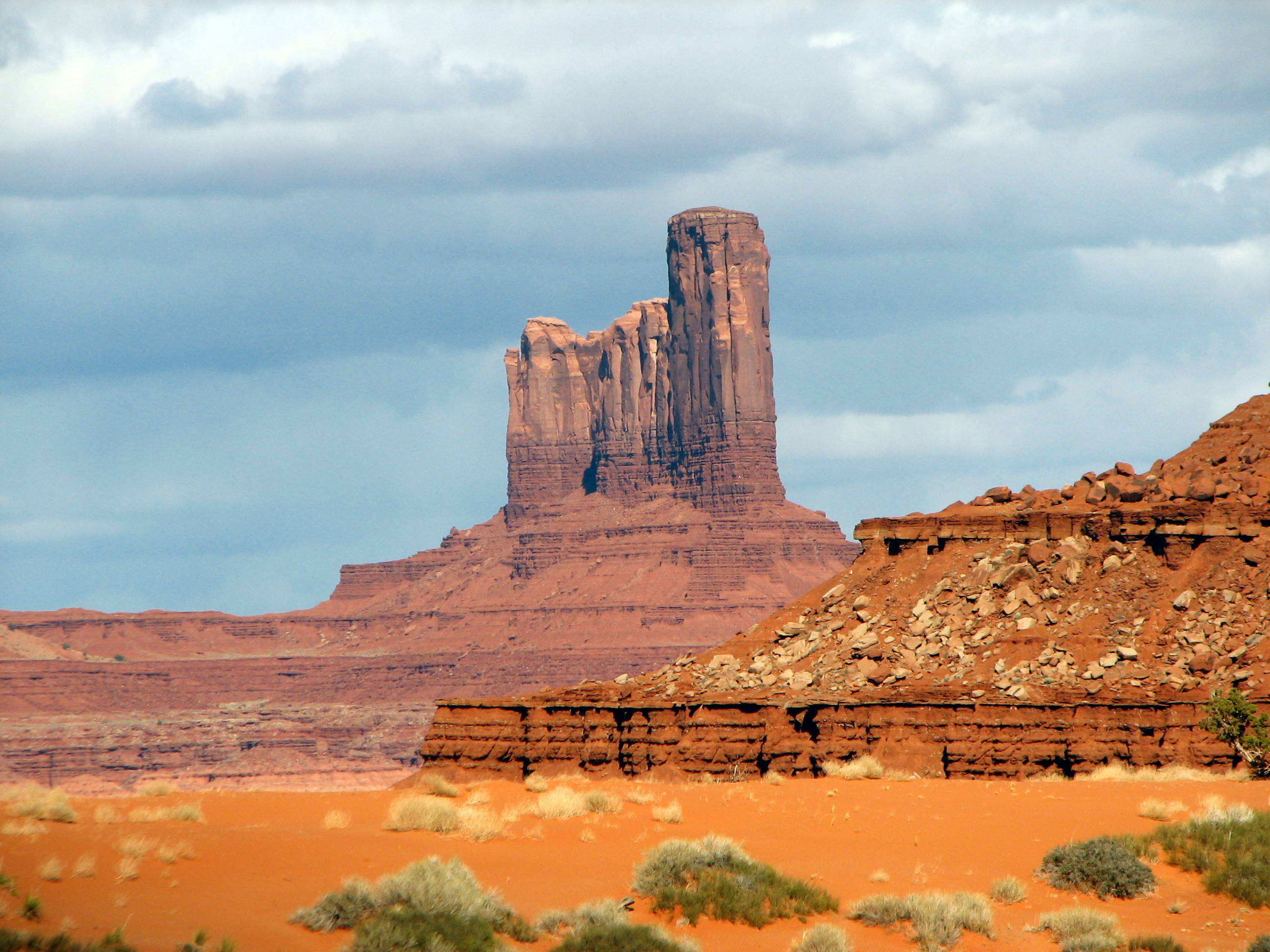
Southwest aspect

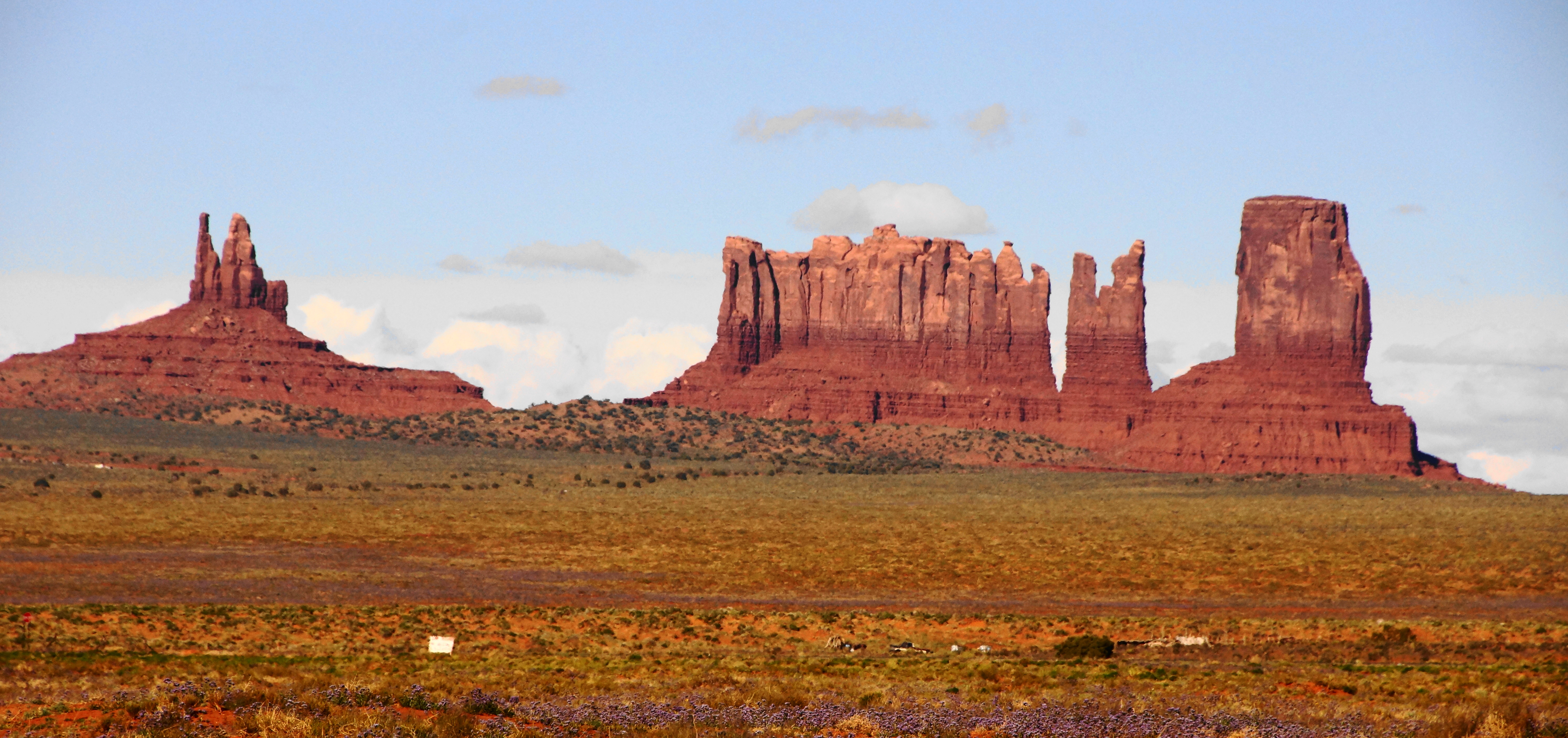
L→R: King-on-his-Throne, Stagecoach, Bear and Rabbit, Castle Rock

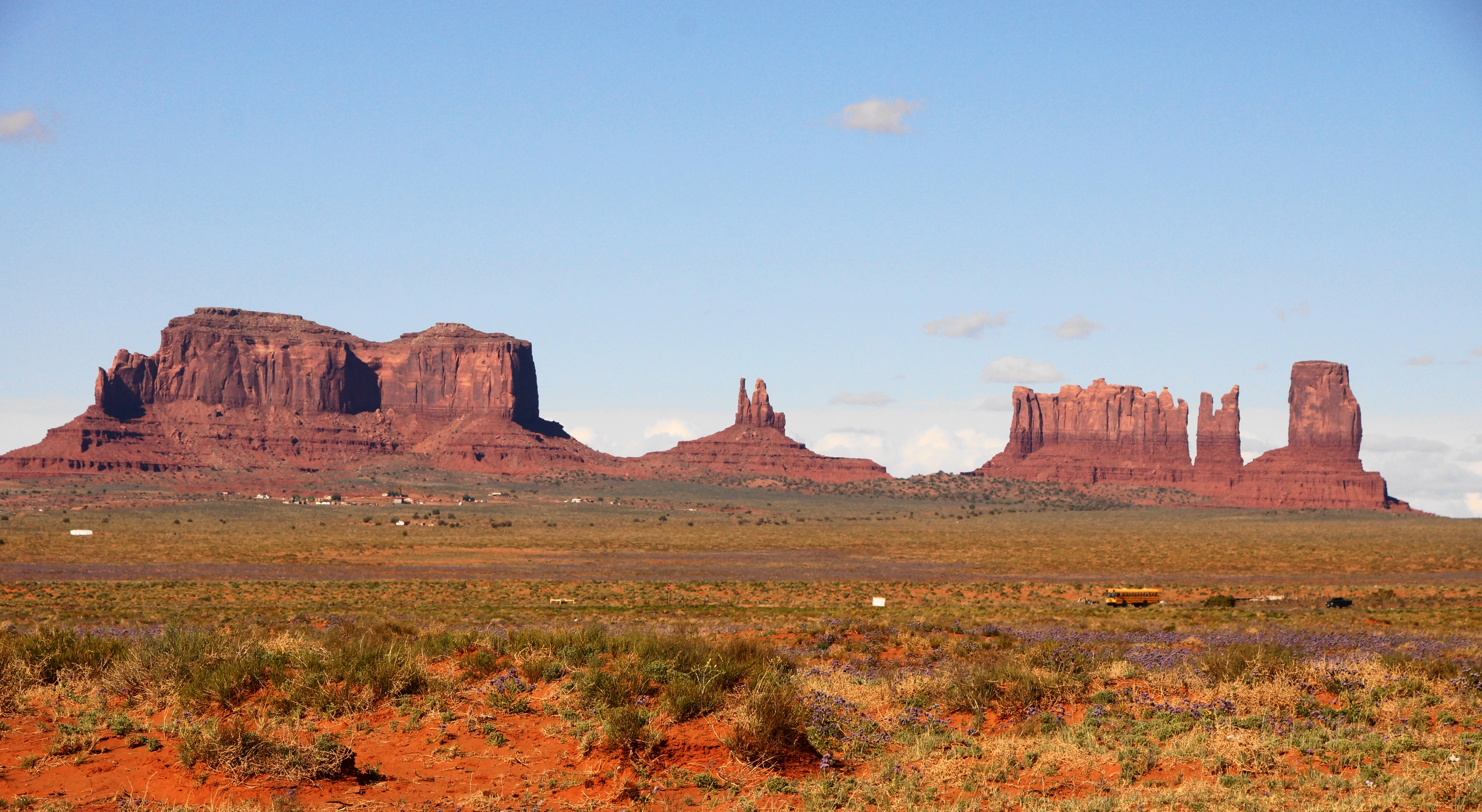
L→R: Brighams Tomb, King-on-his-Throne, Stagecoach, Bear and Rabbit, Castle Rock

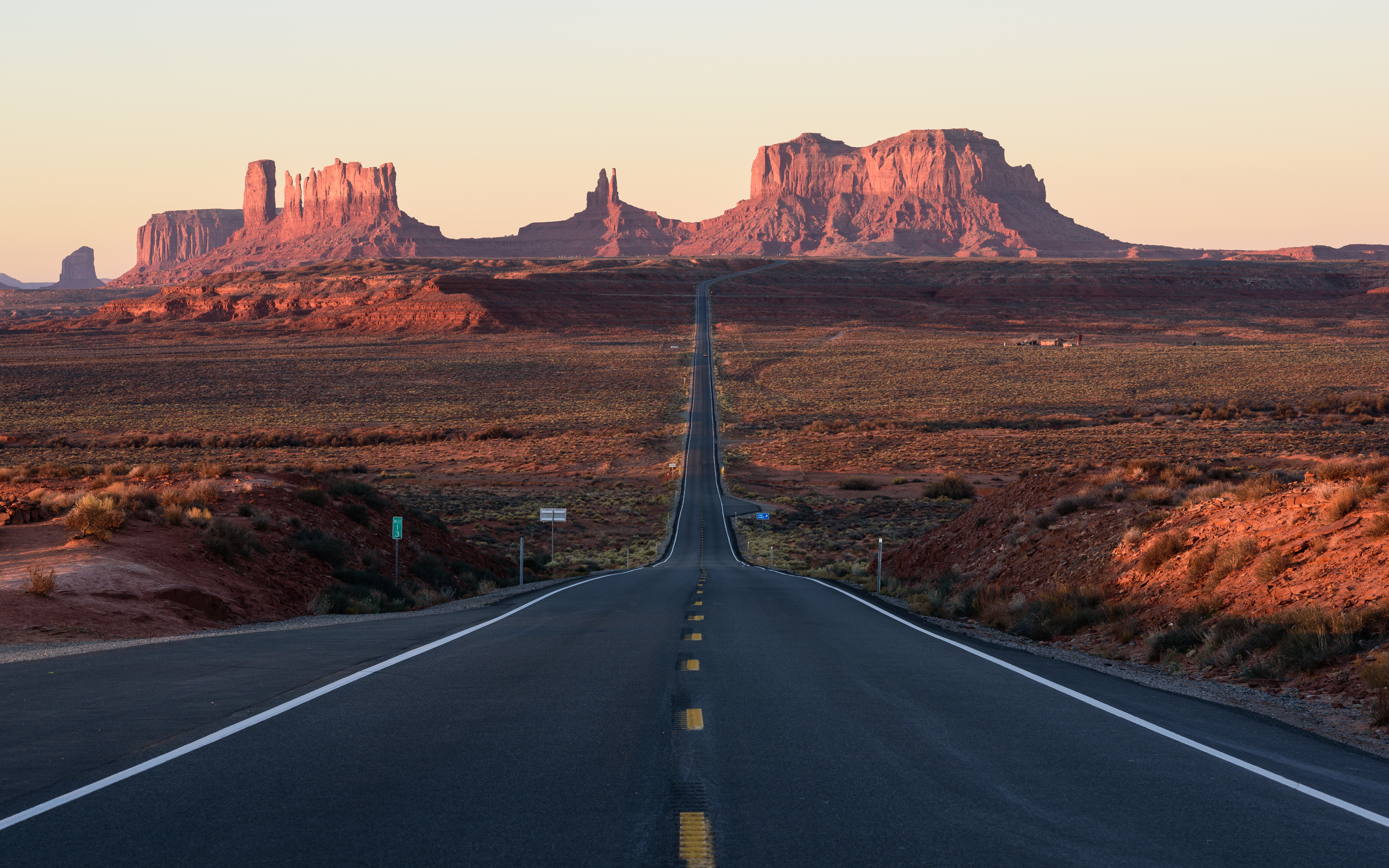
Castle Rock left, Brighams Tomb to right, view southwest from Highway 163.
Forrest Gump was here. (culmination of cross-country running scene)

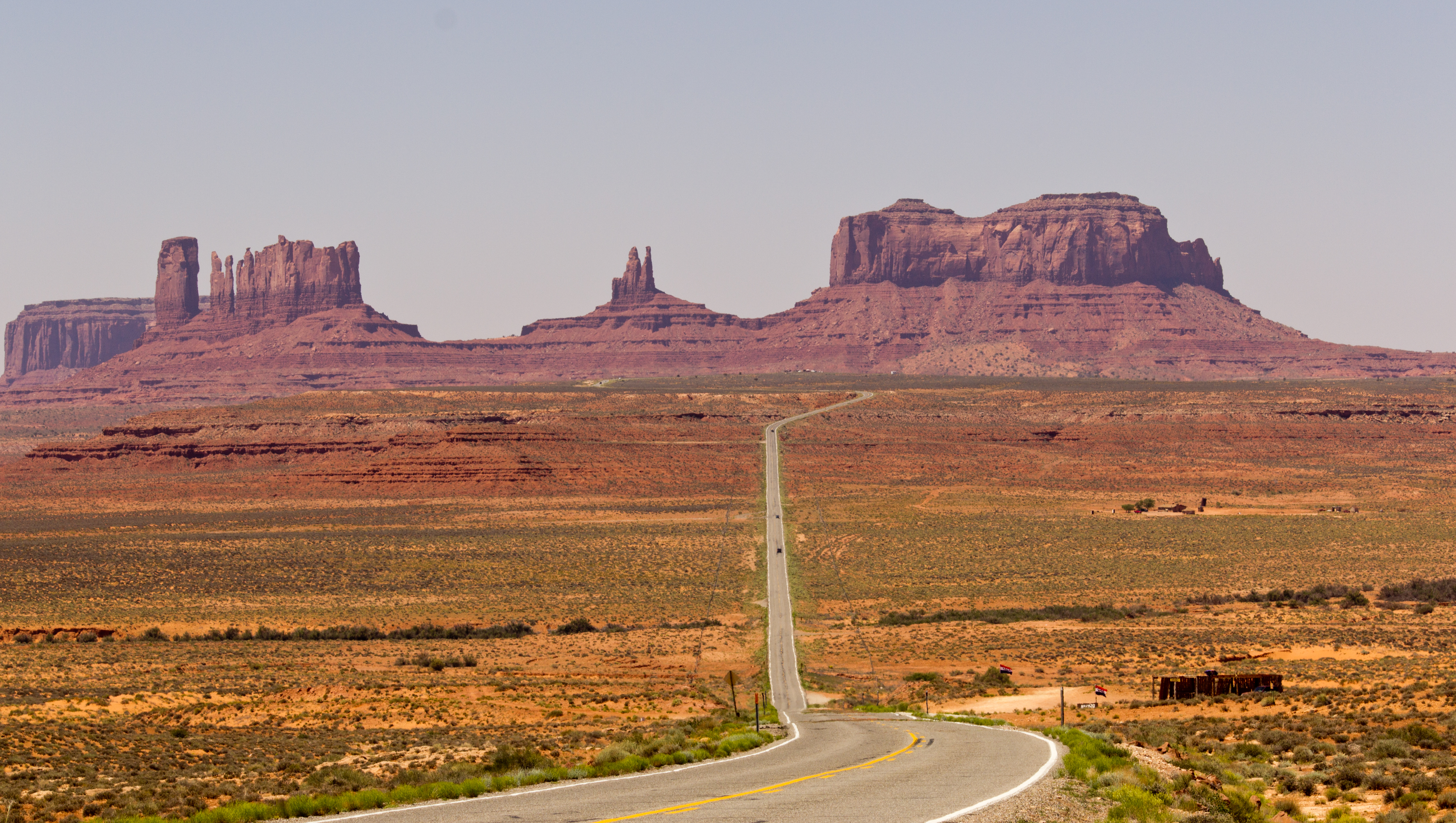
Castle Rock left, Brighams Tomb to right

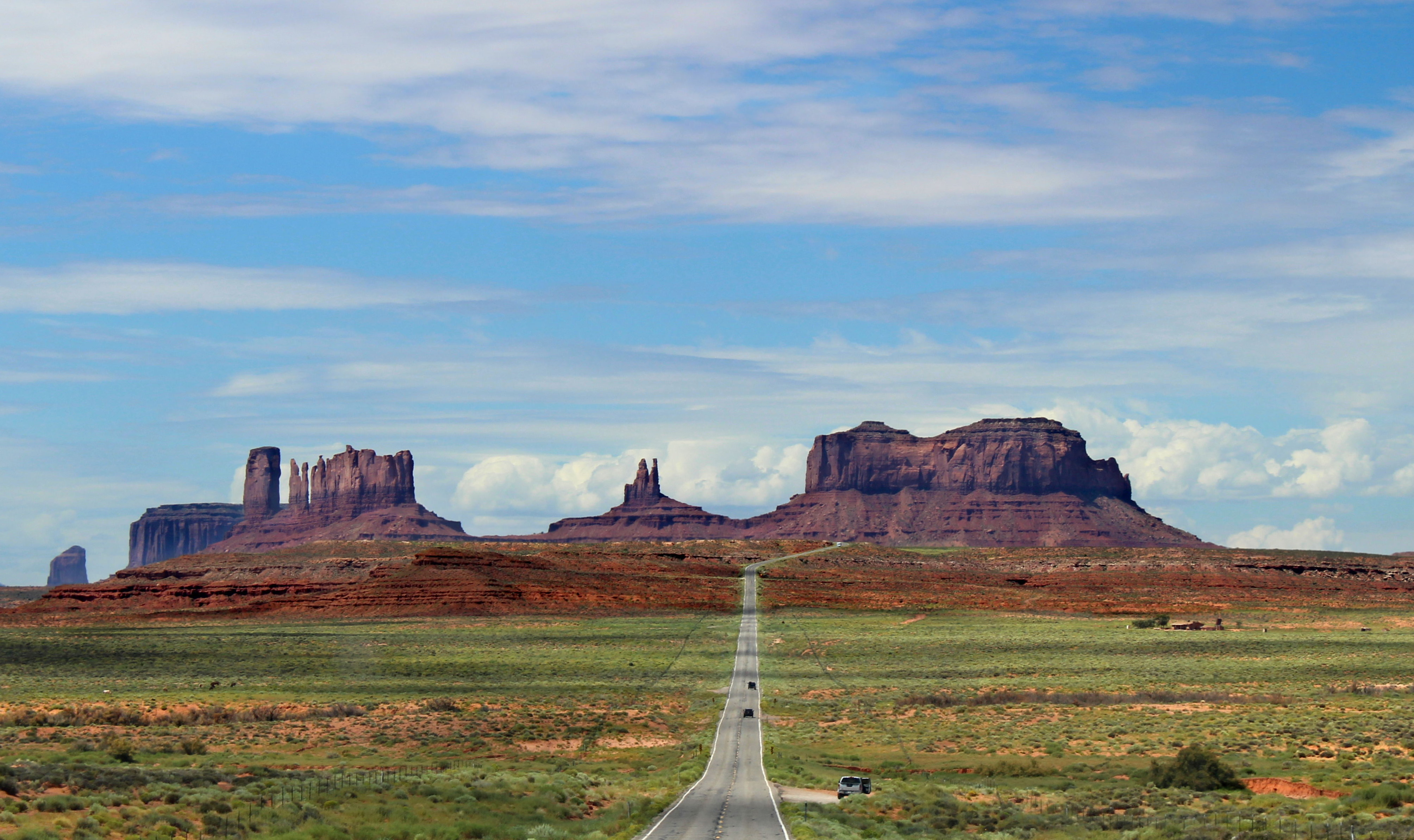
Castle Rock left, Brighams Tomb to right

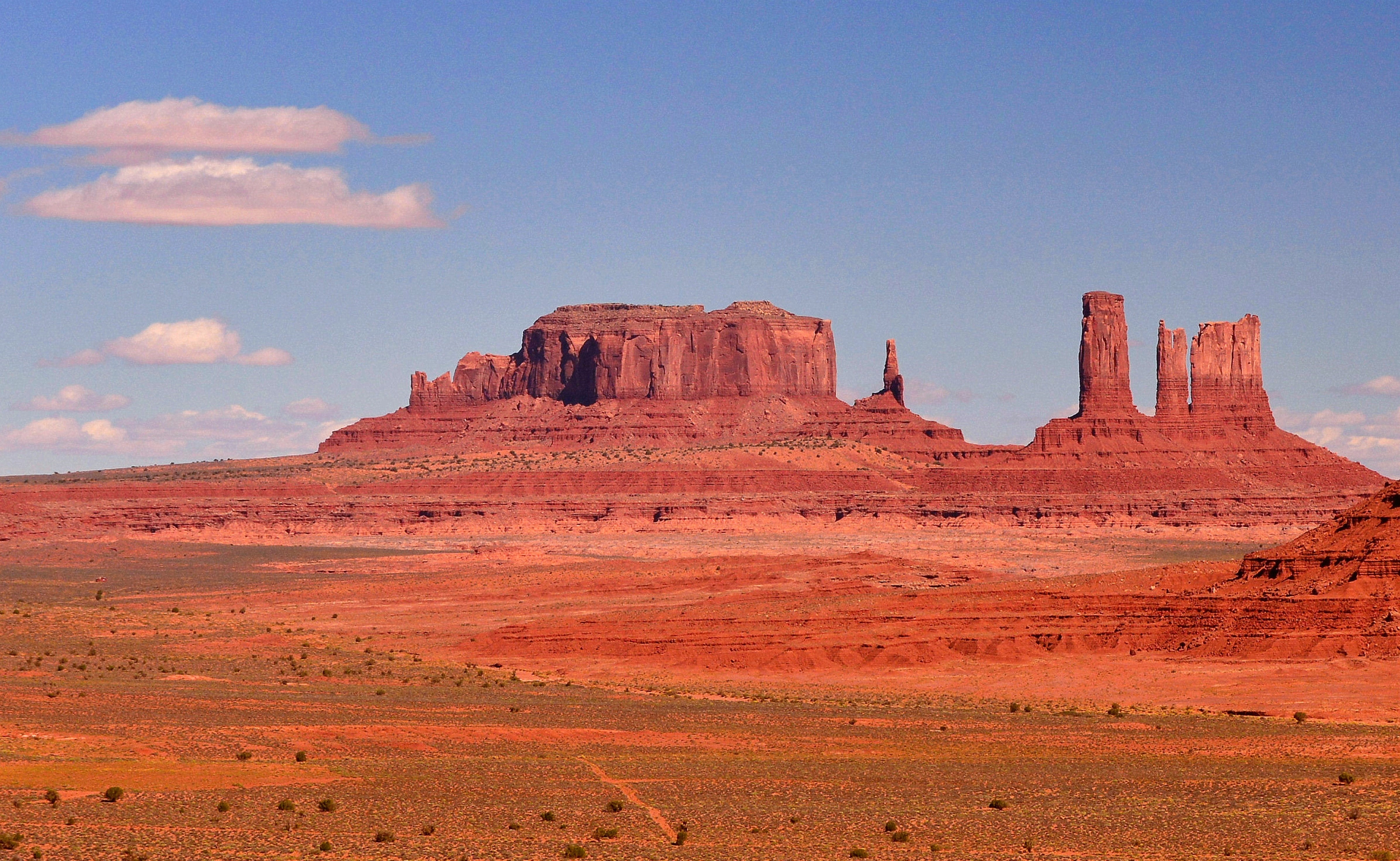
South aspect of Brighams Tomb (centered) and Castle Rock (right) viewed from North Window Overlook

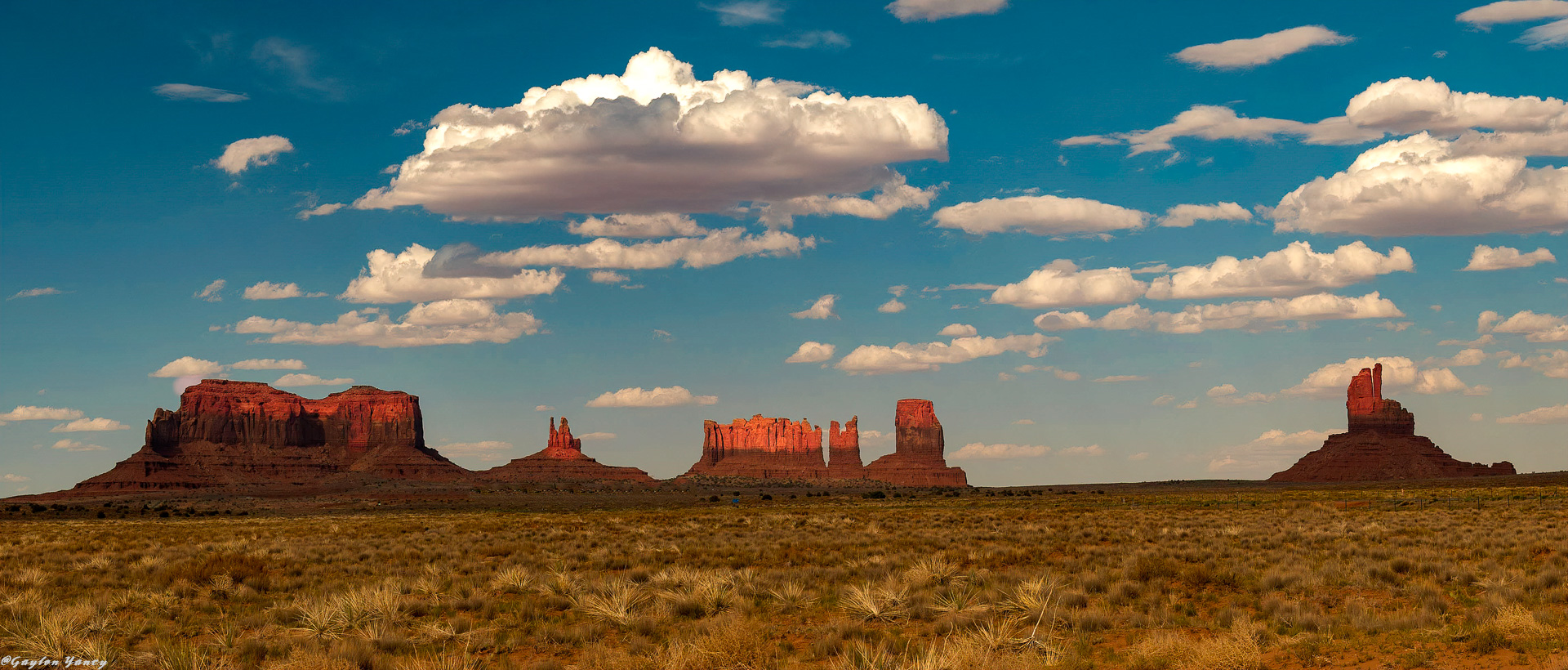
Brighams Tomb (left), Castle Rock (center), Big Indian (right)

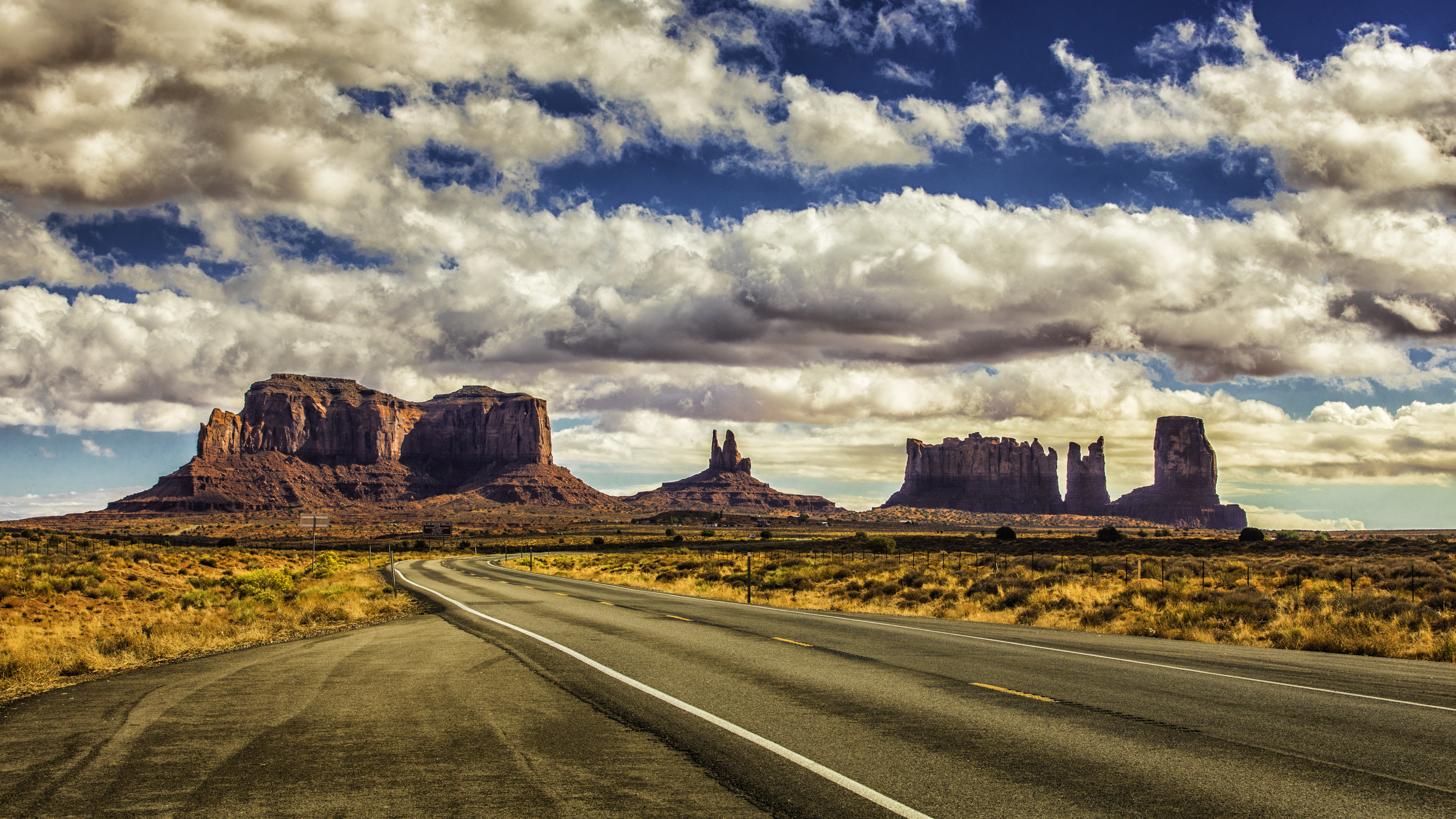
L→R: Brighams Tomb, King-on-his-Throne, Stagecoach, Bear and Rabbit, Castle Rock

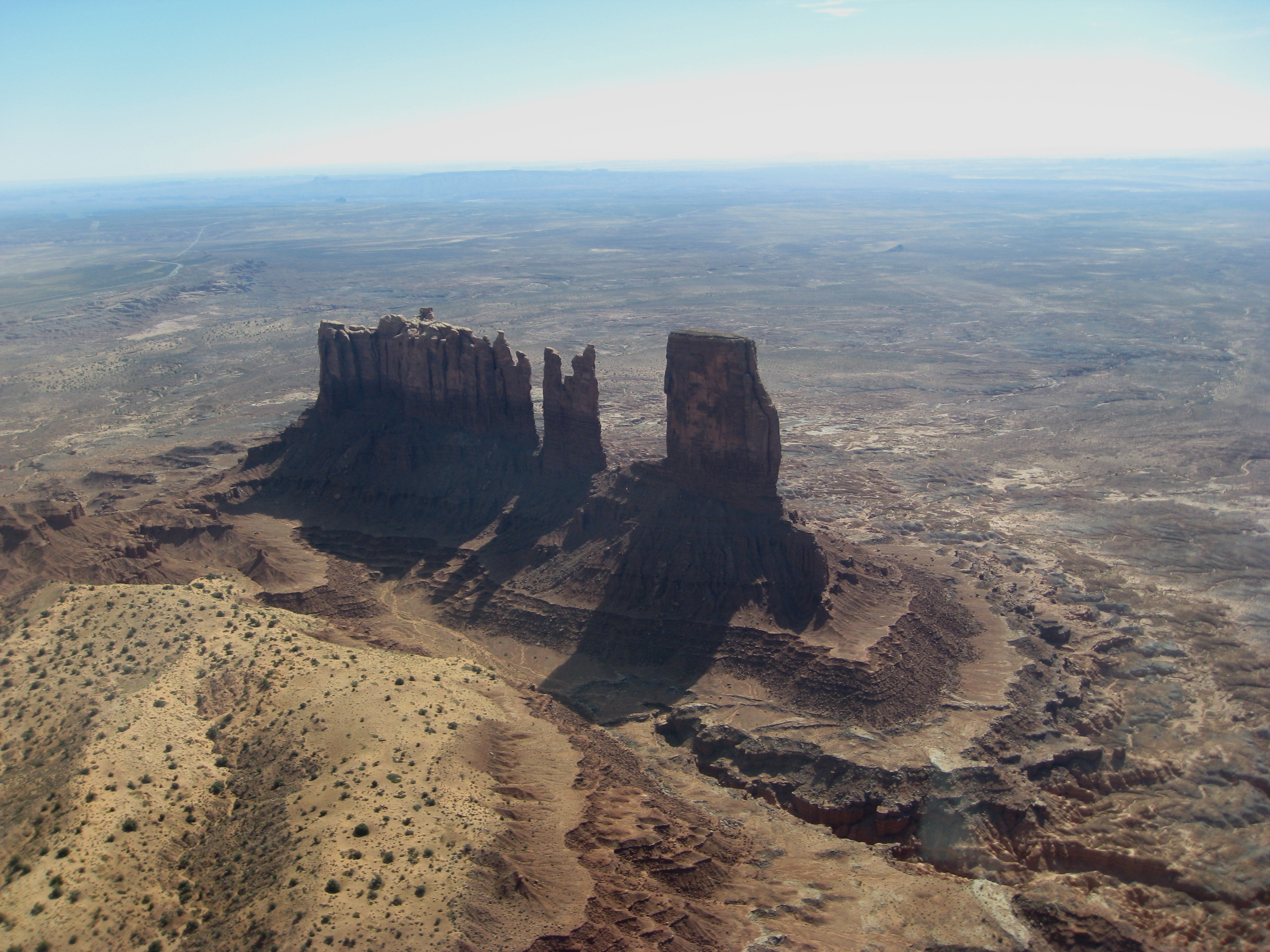
Aerial view

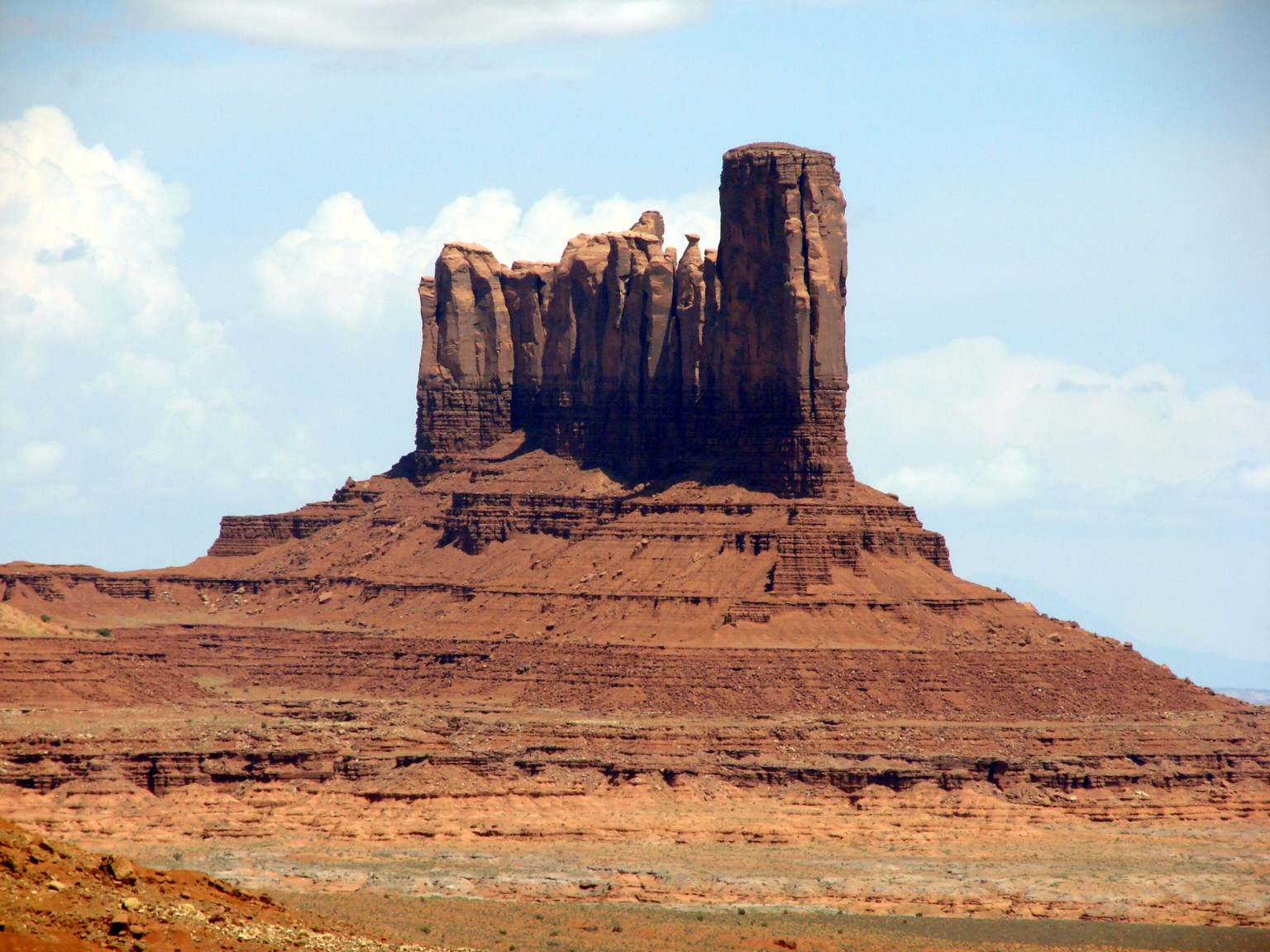

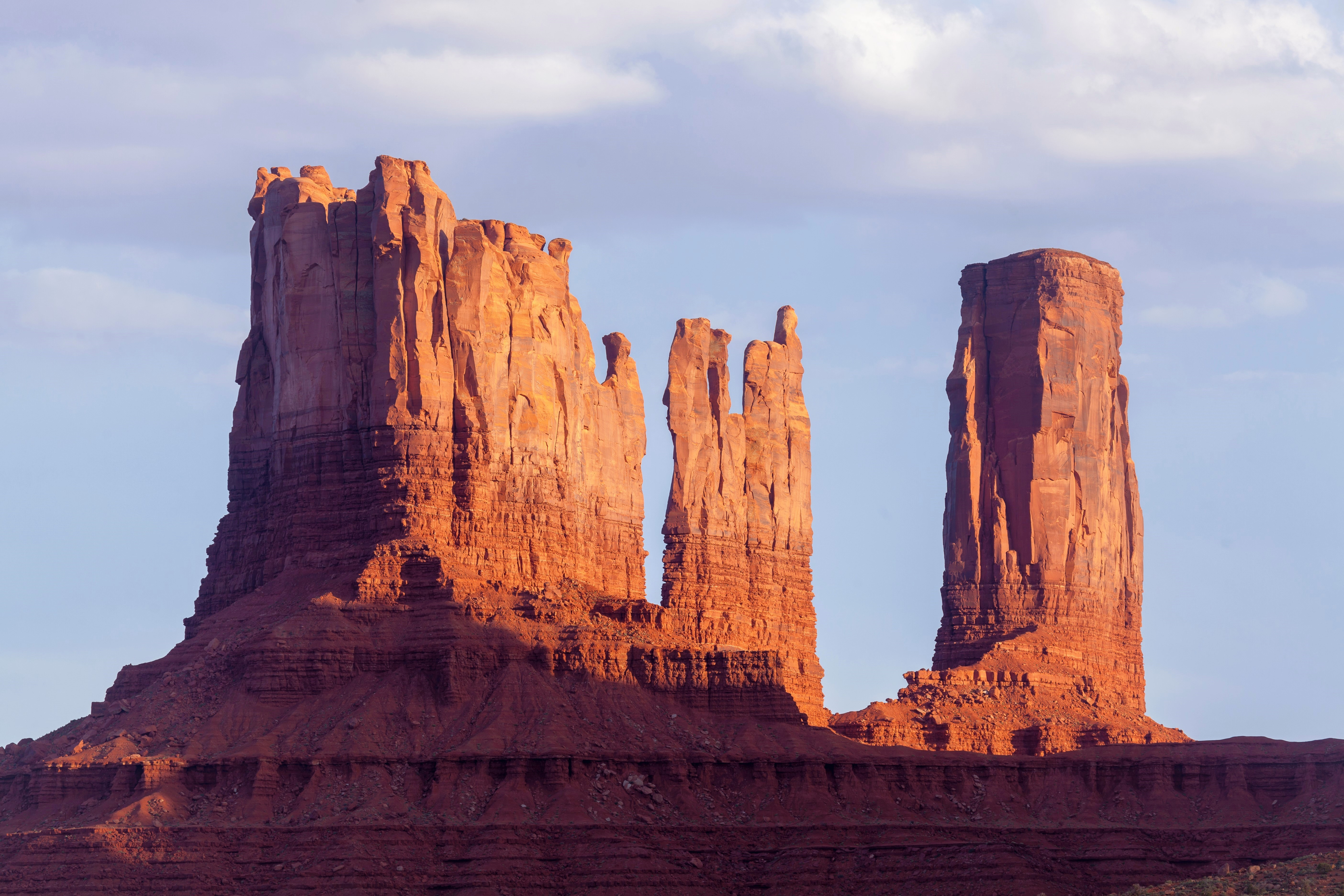
Stagecoach, Bear and Rabbit, Castle Rock (right)

== See also ==
- List of mountains of Utah
- List of appearances of Monument Valley in the media
