= National Register of Historic Places listings in Canyonlands National Park =

This is a list of the National Register of Historic Places listings in Canyonlands National Park.

This is intended to be a complete list of the properties and districts on the National Register of Historic Places in Canyonlands National Park, Utah, United States. The locations of National Register properties and districts for which the latitude and longitude coordinates are included below, may be seen in a Google map.

There are 11 properties and districts listed on the National Register in the park.

This National Park Service list is complete through NPS recent listings posted June 20, 2025.

== Current listings ==
| | Name on the Register | Image | Date listed | Location | City or town | Description |
|---|---|---|---|---|---|---|
| 1 | Cave Springs Cowboy Camp | Cave Springs Cowboy Camp | October 7, 1988 (#88001233) | Cave Springs vicinity 38°09′34″N 109°45′12″W | Moab | In the Needles district of Canyonlands National Park |
| 2 | Cowboy Rock Shelter Site | | June 27, 2019 (#100004109) | Address Restricted | Hanksville vicinity | |
| 3 | D.C.C. & P. Inscription "B" | | October 7, 1988 (#88001251) | Confluence vicinity 38°11′17″N 109°53′12″W | Moab | |
| 4 | Harvest Scene Pictograph | Harvest Scene Pictograph | April 1, 1975 (#75000241) | Address Restricted | Green River | |
| 5 | Horseshoe (Barrier) Canyon Pictograph Panels | Horseshoe (Barrier) Canyon Pictograph Panels | February 23, 1972 (#72000099) | Address Restricted | Green River | |
| 6 | Denis Julien Inscription (San Juan County, Utah) | | October 7, 1988 (#88001248) | Lower Red Lake vicinity 38°09′16″N 109°55′32″W | Moab | |
| 7 | Kirk's Cabin Complex | Kirk's Cabin Complex | October 7, 1988 (#88001252) | Upper Salt Walsh; 37°59′16″N 109°44′27″W | Moab | |
| 8 | Kolb Brothers "Cat Camp" Inscription | | October 7, 1988 (#88001250) | Big Drop #2 vicinity 38°04′57″N 110°02′32″W | Moab | |
| 9 | Lost Canyon Cowboy Camp | Lost Canyon Cowboy Camp | October 7, 1988 (#88001232) | Lost Canyon vicinity 38°08′13″N 109°45′32″W | Moab | |
| 10 | Murphy Trail and Bridge | Murphy Trail and Bridge | October 7, 1988 (#88001236) | Murphy Point vicinity 38°20′37″N 109°52′15″W | Moab | |
| 11 | Neck and Cabin Springs Grazing Area | | December 18, 2009 (#09001108) | Grand View Point Rd. 38°25′09″N 109°50′04″W | Moab | |
| 12 | Salt Creek Archeological District | | March 31, 1975 (#75000164) | Address Restricted | Monticello | |

== See also ==
- National Register of Historic Places listings in Grand County, Utah
- National Register of Historic Places listings in Wayne County, Utah
- National Register of Historic Places listings in San Juan County, Utah
- National Register of Historic Places listings in Garfield County, Utah
- National Register of Historic Places listings in Utah
