= Indian Creek Wilderness Study Area =

Protected area in Utah, United States

- IUCN category Ib (wilderness area)
- Location within Utah Location within the United States
- Location: San Juan County, Utah
- Nearest city: Moab, Utah
- Coordinates: 38°15′N 109°44′W
- Area: 6,870 acres (27.8 km^{2})
- Established: 1980
- Governing body: Bureau of Land Management

The Indian Creek Wilderness Study Area is a wilderness study area managed by the United States Bureau of Land Management in southern Utah. It encompasses 6,870 acres (10.73 sq mi; 27.8 km^{2}) of land immediately east of the Needles district of Canyonlands National Park in the rugged lower stretches of Indian Creek, near where it flows into the Colorado River.
