= Cave Springs Cowboy Camp =

- U.S. National Register of Historic Places
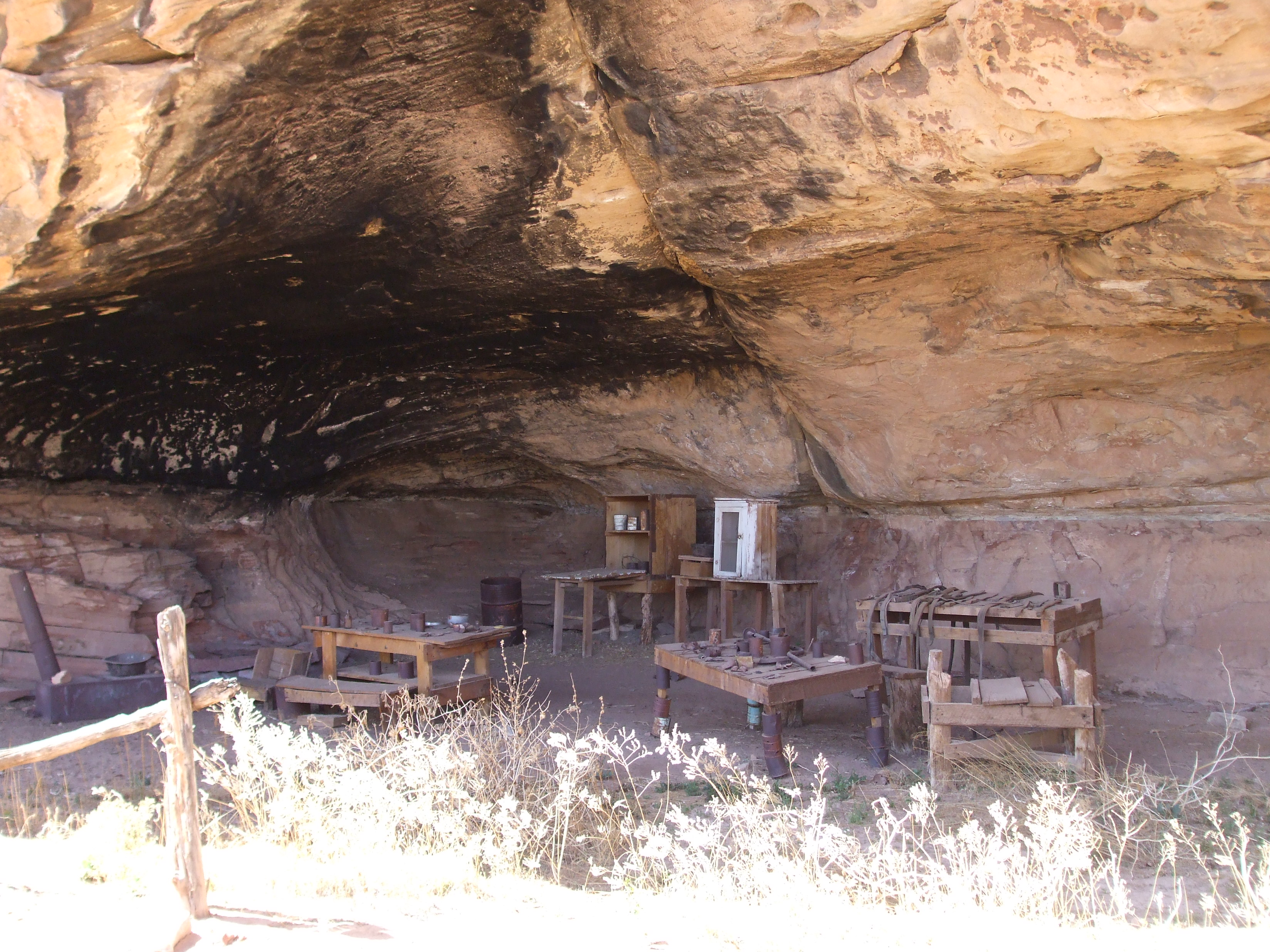
- Cowboy tools found at the site

- Location within Utah Location within the United States
- Nearest city: Moab, Utah
- Coordinates: 38°9′34″N 109°45′12″W
- Built: 1890
- MPS: Canyonlands National Park MRA
- NRHP reference No.: 88001233
- Added to NRHP: October 07, 1988

Cave Springs Cowboy Camp was a line camp operated by the Scorup-Sommerville Cattle Company in what would become Canyonlands National Park, Utah. The site consists of a cave-like shelter under a rock overhang on the side of a small canyon. The canyon was arranged with a fence across the opening that allowed its use as a cattle pen. The site contains a great deal of material that was abandoned as the site became disused. The shelter was used from the late 1890s through the late 1960s when the park was established.

== See also ==
- Lost Canyon Cowboy Camp
