= Junction Butte =

Butte in Utah, United States

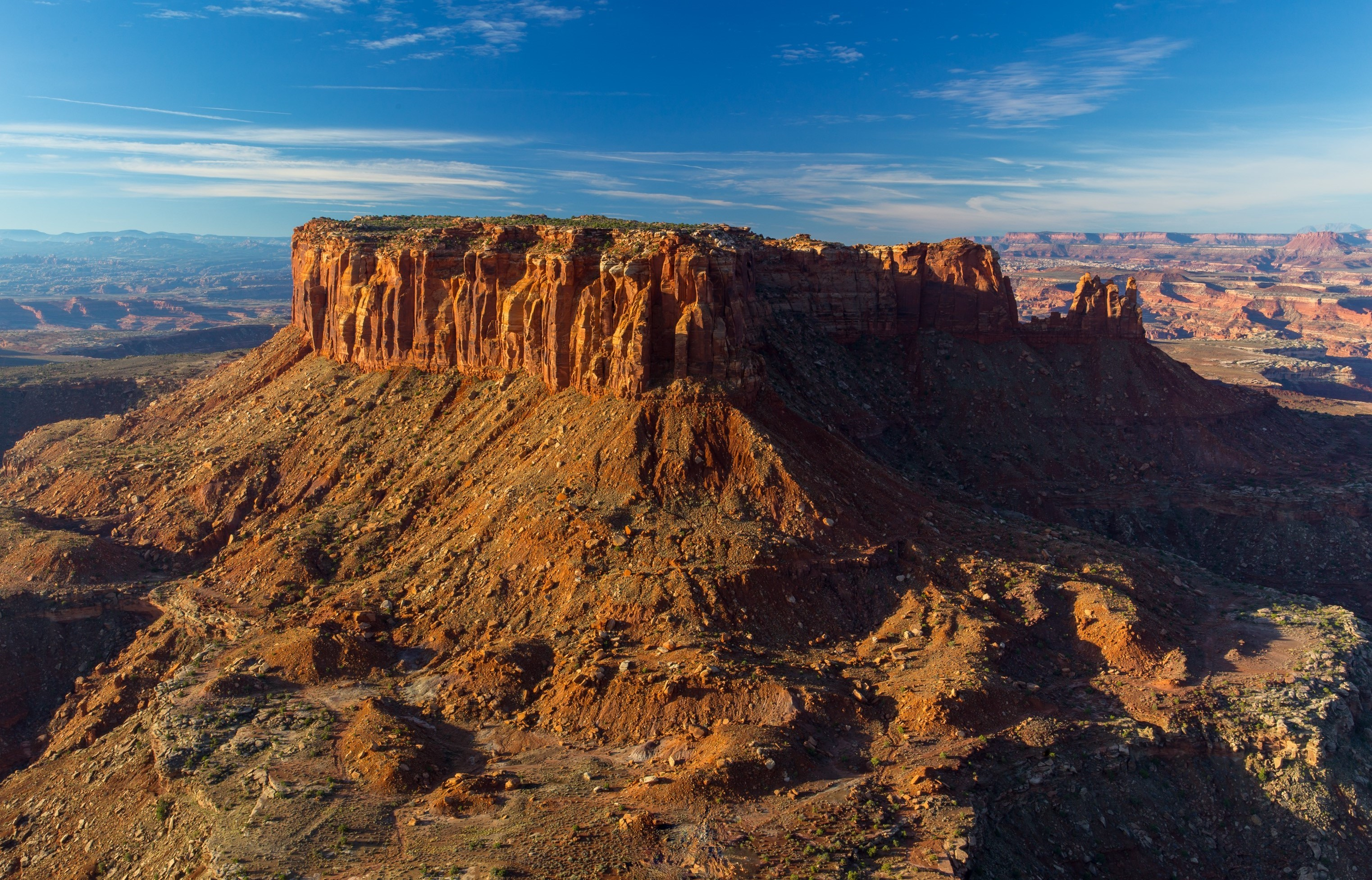
- North aspect from Grand View Point

Highest point
- Elevation: 6,400 ft (2,000 m)
- Prominence: 1,720 ft (520 m)
- Parent peak: Elaterite Butte (6,552 ft)
- Isolation: 10.16 mi (16.35 km)
- Coordinates: 38°17′11″N 109°52′23″W

Geography
- Location within Utah Location within the United States
- Country: United States
- State: Utah
- County: San Juan
- Protected area: Canyonlands National Park
- Parent range: Colorado Plateau
- Topo map: USGS Monument Basin

Geology
- Rock age: Late Triassic
- Rock type: Wingate Sandstone

Climbing
- Easiest route: class 5.2 climbing

Junction Butte is a 6,400-foot-elevation (2,000-meter) summit located in the Island in the Sky District of Canyonlands National Park, in San Juan County, Utah. It is set about one mile south of the southern tip of Island in the Sky. A short hike to Grand View Point provides a view of Junction Butte. Access to this butte is via the four-wheel drive White Rim Road, which is another option to view Junction Butte. Topographic relief is significant as the top of this geological formation rises 1,400 feet above the road in less than one mile. Precipitation runoff from Junction Butte drains east into the nearby Colorado River, and west into nearby Green River. Junction Butte is situated north of the junction of these two major rivers.

== Geology ==
This feature is composed of hard, fine-grained Wingate Sandstone, which is the remains of wind-borne sand dunes deposited approximately 200 million years ago in the Late Triassic. This Wingate sandstone, capped by Kayenta Formation, forms steep cliffs as it overlays softer layers of the Chinle Formation.

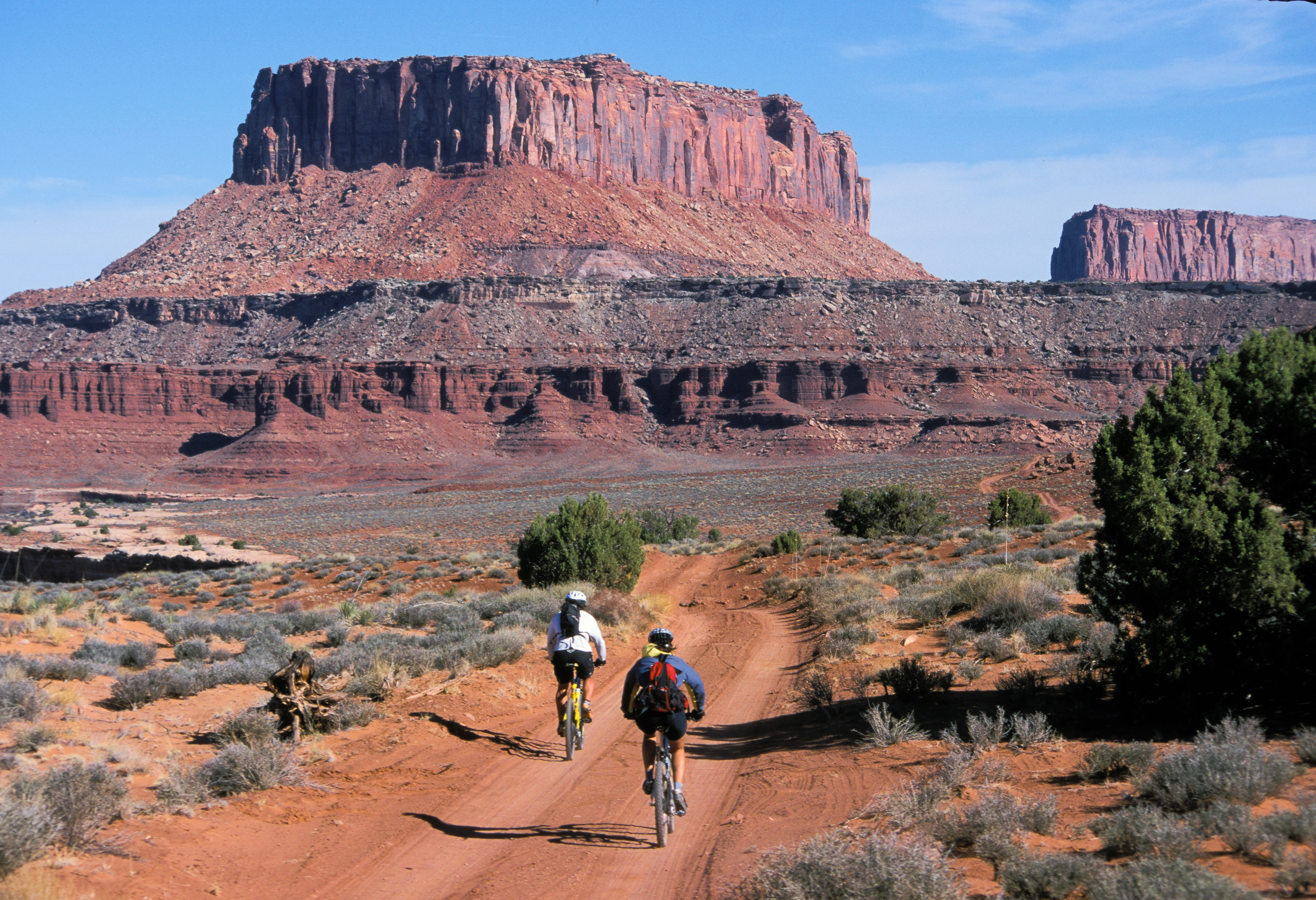
East aspect, from White Rim Road

== Climate ==
Spring and fall are the most favorable seasons to visit Junction Butte. According to the Köppen climate classification system, it is located in a Cold semi-arid climate zone, which is defined by the coldest month having an average mean temperature below −0 °C (32 °F) and at least 50% of the total annual precipitation being received during the spring and summer. This desert climate receives less than 10 inches (250 millimeters) of annual rainfall, and snowfall is generally light during the winter.

Climate data for Island in the Sky Visitor Center, elevation 5,666 ft (1,727 m), 1981-2010 normals, extremes 1981-2019
| Month | Jan | Feb | Mar | Apr | May | Jun | Jul | Aug | Sep | Oct | Nov | Dec | Year |
|---|---|---|---|---|---|---|---|---|---|---|---|---|---|
| Record high °F (°C) | 58.6 (14.8) | 69.0 (20.6) | 79.8 (26.6) | 86.1 (30.1) | 98.5 (36.9) | 103.9 (39.9) | 106.4 (41.3) | 101.1 (38.4) | 97.9 (36.6) | 86.9 (30.5) | 71.0 (21.7) | 59.2 (15.1) | 106.4 (41.3) |
| Mean daily maximum °F (°C) | 38.1 (3.4) | 44.1 (6.7) | 54.9 (12.7) | 63.5 (17.5) | 74.2 (23.4) | 85.4 (29.7) | 91.7 (33.2) | 88.7 (31.5) | 79.5 (26.4) | 65.8 (18.8) | 49.7 (9.8) | 38.1 (3.4) | 64.6 (18.1) |
| Mean daily minimum °F (°C) | 20.8 (−6.2) | 25.8 (−3.4) | 33.3 (0.7) | 40.0 (4.4) | 49.5 (9.7) | 59.8 (15.4) | 66.0 (18.9) | 63.9 (17.7) | 54.9 (12.7) | 42.5 (5.8) | 31.1 (−0.5) | 21.3 (−5.9) | 42.5 (5.8) |
| Record low °F (°C) | −8.0 (−22.2) | −12.4 (−24.7) | 10.4 (−12.0) | 16.3 (−8.7) | 26.0 (−3.3) | 28.7 (−1.8) | 46.0 (7.8) | 50.2 (10.1) | 27.6 (−2.4) | 9.2 (−12.7) | 6.2 (−14.3) | −9.4 (−23.0) | −12.4 (−24.7) |
| Average precipitation inches (mm) | 0.53 (13) | 0.50 (13) | 0.76 (19) | 0.72 (18) | 0.70 (18) | 0.45 (11) | 0.93 (24) | 1.04 (26) | 1.06 (27) | 1.30 (33) | 0.70 (18) | 0.58 (15) | 9.27 (235) |
| Average dew point °F (°C) | 18.6 (−7.4) | 21.8 (−5.7) | 23.3 (−4.8) | 25.7 (−3.5) | 29.5 (−1.4) | 32.7 (0.4) | 41.2 (5.1) | 45.1 (7.3) | 37.6 (3.1) | 29.5 (−1.4) | 23.2 (−4.9) | 17.9 (−7.8) | 28.9 (−1.7) |
Source: PRISM

== See also ==
- Colorado Plateau
- Geology of the Canyonlands area
