= Kolb Brothers "Cat Camp" Inscription =

- U.S. National Register of Historic Places
- Location within Utah Location within the United States
- Nearest city: Moab, Utah
- Coordinates: 38°4′57″N 110°2′32″W
- Area: less than one acre
- Architect: Kolb, Ellsworth; Kolb, Emery
- MPS: Canyonlands National Park MRA
- NRHP reference No.: 88001250
- Added to NRHP: October 7, 1988

The Kolb Brothers "Cat Camp" Inscription is a 5-foot (1.5 m) by 9-foot (2.7 m) painted inscription on a vertical rock face in Cataract Canyon in Canyonlands National Park, created by Emery and Ellsworth Kolb at one of their campsites during a 1911 exploration of the Colorado River. The inscription reads "E.C. & E.L. Kolb Cat Camp 2 10-28-1911." The Kolb brothers' expedition began on September 28, 1911 at Green River, Wyoming and ended on November 11 at Needles, California. The Kolbs documented their journey with movies and photographs, which they sold at their studio in Grand Canyon National Park. The site was placed on the National Register of Historic Places on October 7, 1988.
