= Lost Canyon Cowboy Camp =

- U.S. National Register of Historic Places
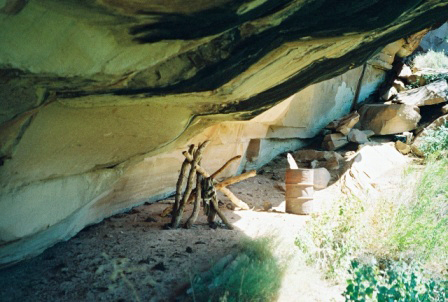

- Location within Utah Location within the United States
- Nearest city: Moab, Utah
- Coordinates: 38°8′13″N 109°45′32″W
- Built: 1919
- Architect: Hatch, Ellis
- MPS: Canyonlands National Park MRA
- NRHP reference No.: 88001232
- Added to NRHP: October 07, 1988

The Lost Canyon Cowboy Camp was a line camp operated by the Scorup-Sommerville Cattle Company in what would become Canyonlands National Park, Utah. There is a little built structure; the site is significant for its in situ artifacts and graffiti, located beneath a rock overhang. The shelter was used from 1919 through the late 1960s when the park was established.

== See also ==
- Cave Springs Cowboy Camp
