= Angel Arch =

Natural arch in San Juan County, Utah

- Rock arch
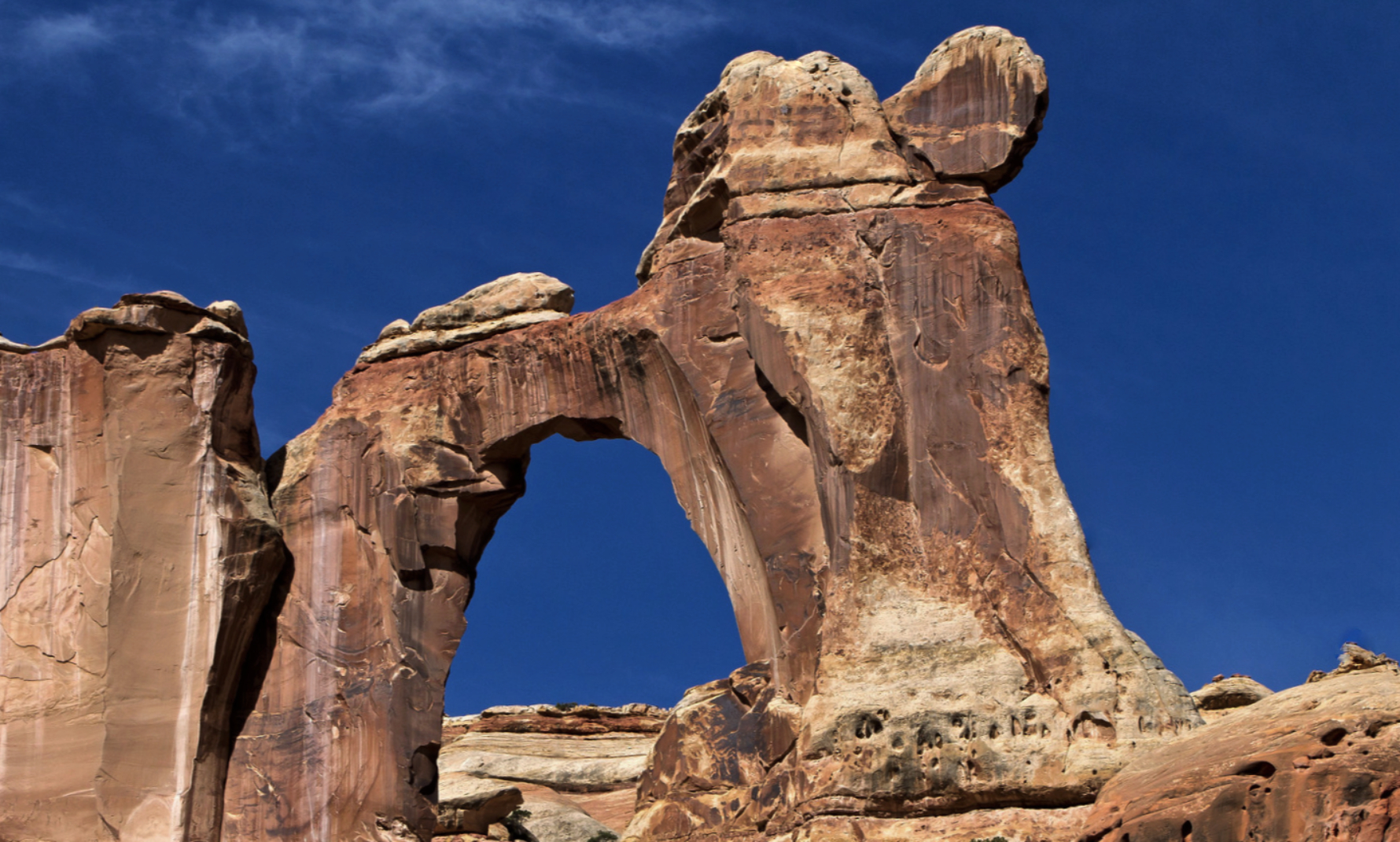
- East aspect in the morning light

- Location within Utah Location within the United States
- Coordinates: 38°03′07″N 109°45′18″W
- Location: Canyonlands National Park; San Juan County, Utah, U.S.
- Age: Permian
- Geology: Cedar Mesa Sandstone

Dimensions
  - Width: 120 ft (37 m)
  - Height: 135 ft (41 m)
- Elevation: 1,735 m (5,692 ft)
- Topo map: USGS Druid Arch

Angel Arch is the largest natural arch located within Canyonlands National Park, in San Juan County, Utah. Some consider it the most beautiful and spectacular arch in the park, if not the entire canyon country. It is situated in a side canyon of Salt Creek Canyon, in the Needles District of the park. Precipitation runoff from Angel Arch drains north into the nearby Colorado River via Salt Creek. A 29-mile round-trip hike to Angel Arch leads to a viewpoint, and an additional 0.75-mile trail scrambles up into the arch opening. The arch's descriptive name comes from its resemblance to an angel with wings folded, and standing with its back to the arch opening. Before this feature's name was officially adopted in 1963 by the U.S. Board on Geographic Names, it was called Pegasus Arch. The first ascent was made in June 1993, by John Markel and Kevin Chase.

== Geology ==
This geological formation is an eroded fin composed of Cedar Mesa Sandstone, which is the remains of coastal sand dunes deposited about 245–286 million years ago, during the early Permian period. The top of the formation rises 450 feet (140 m) above the canyon floor, and the opening has a height of 135 feet (41 m), and a width of 120 feet (37 m).

== Climate ==
Spring and fall are the most favorable seasons to visit Angel Arch. According to the Köppen climate classification system, it is located in a Cold semi-arid climate zone, which is defined by the coldest month having an average mean temperature below −0 °C (32 °F) and at least 50% of the total annual precipitation being received during the spring and summer. This desert climate receives less than 10 inches (250 millimeters) of annual rainfall, and snowfall is generally light during the winter.

== Gallery ==
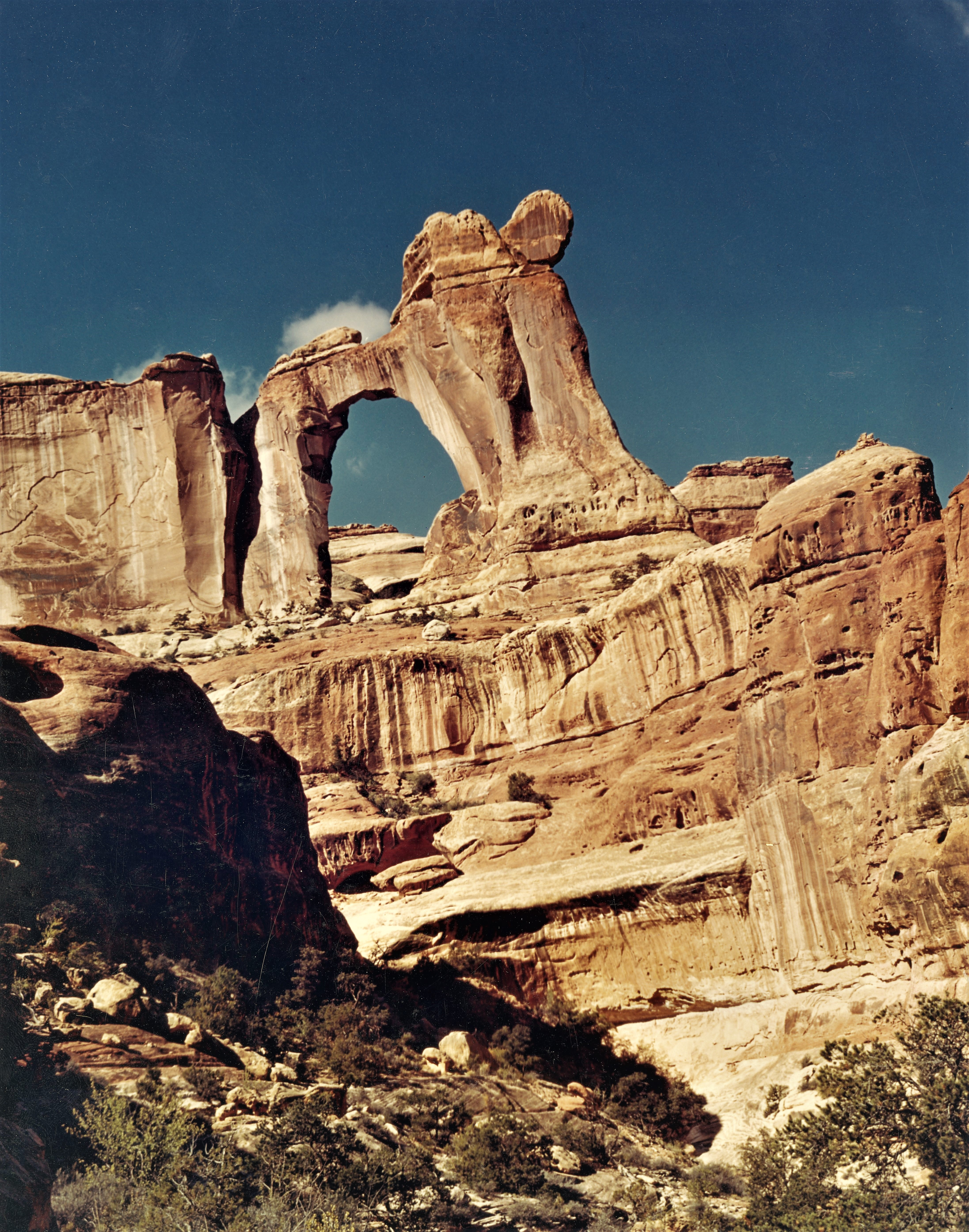
Angel Arch

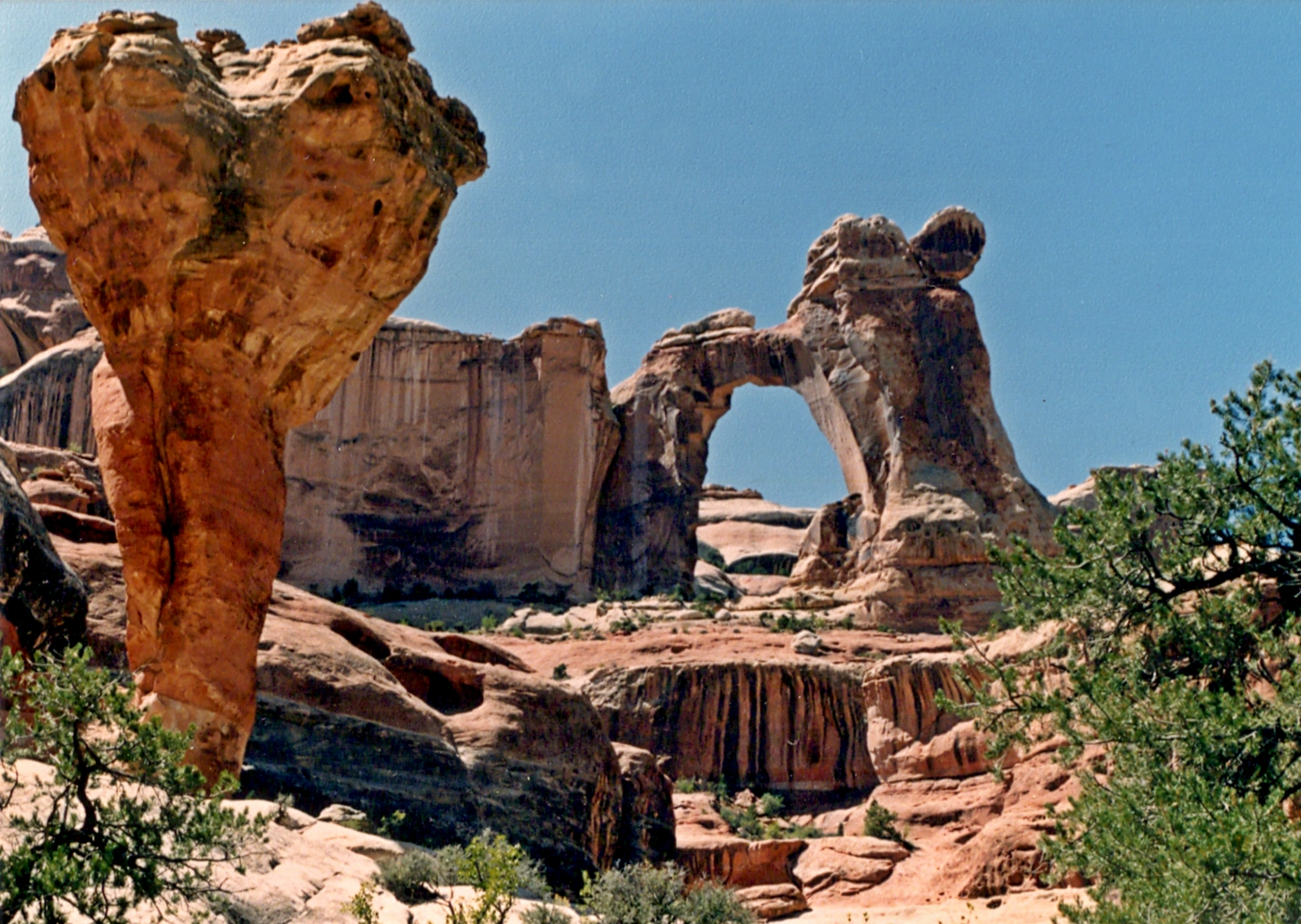
The Molar (left) and Angel Arch at mid-day

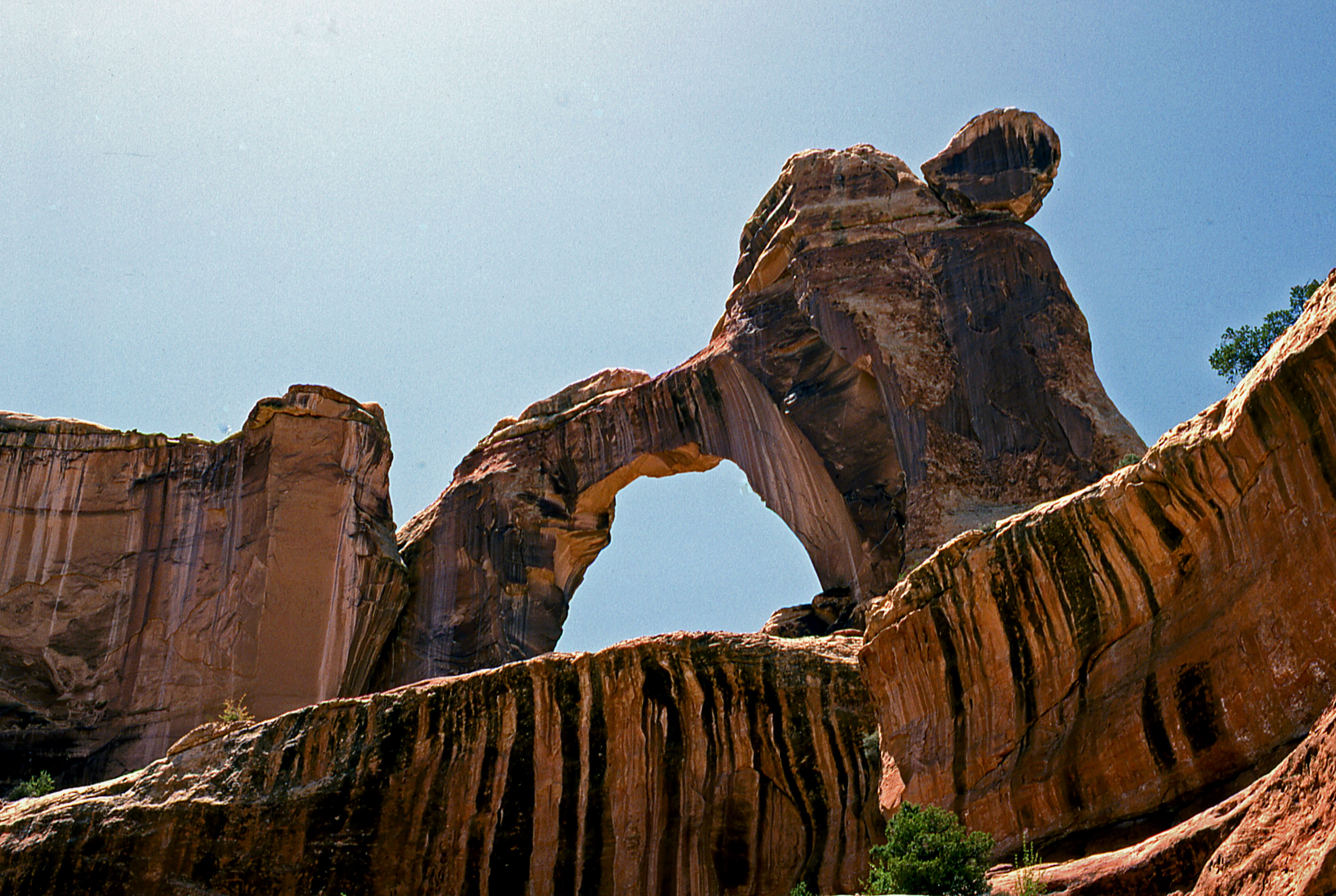
East aspect in afternoon

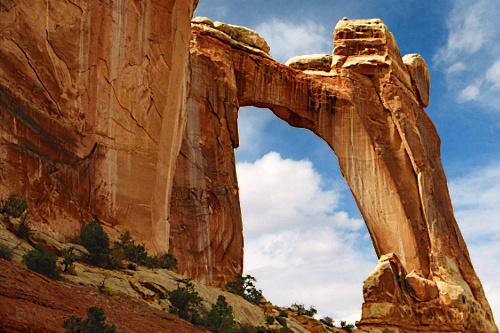
Southeast aspect

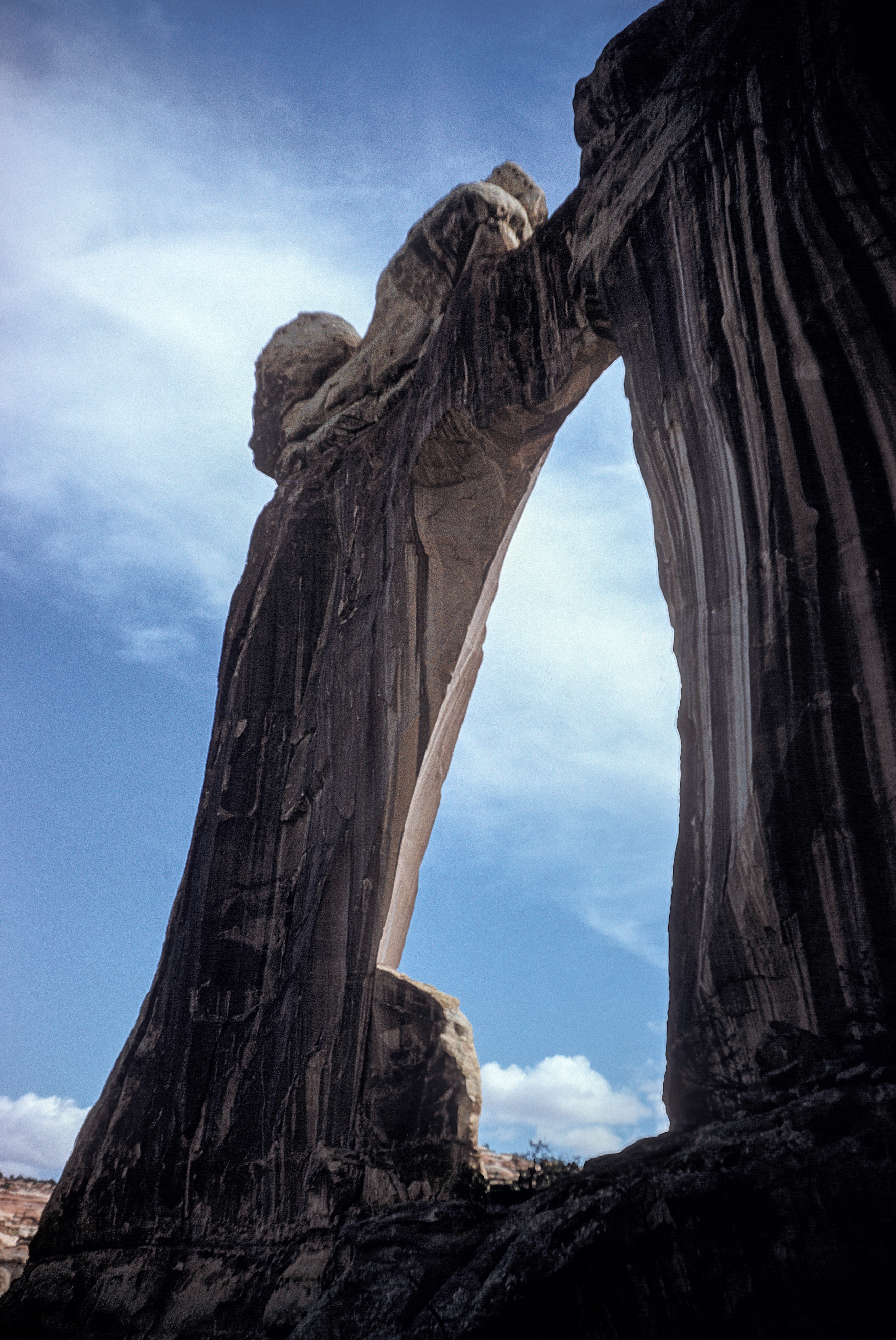
Southwest aspect

== See also ==
- Colorado Plateau
- Geology of Utah
