= False Kiva =

Stone circle in a cave in the Canyonlands National Park in Utah

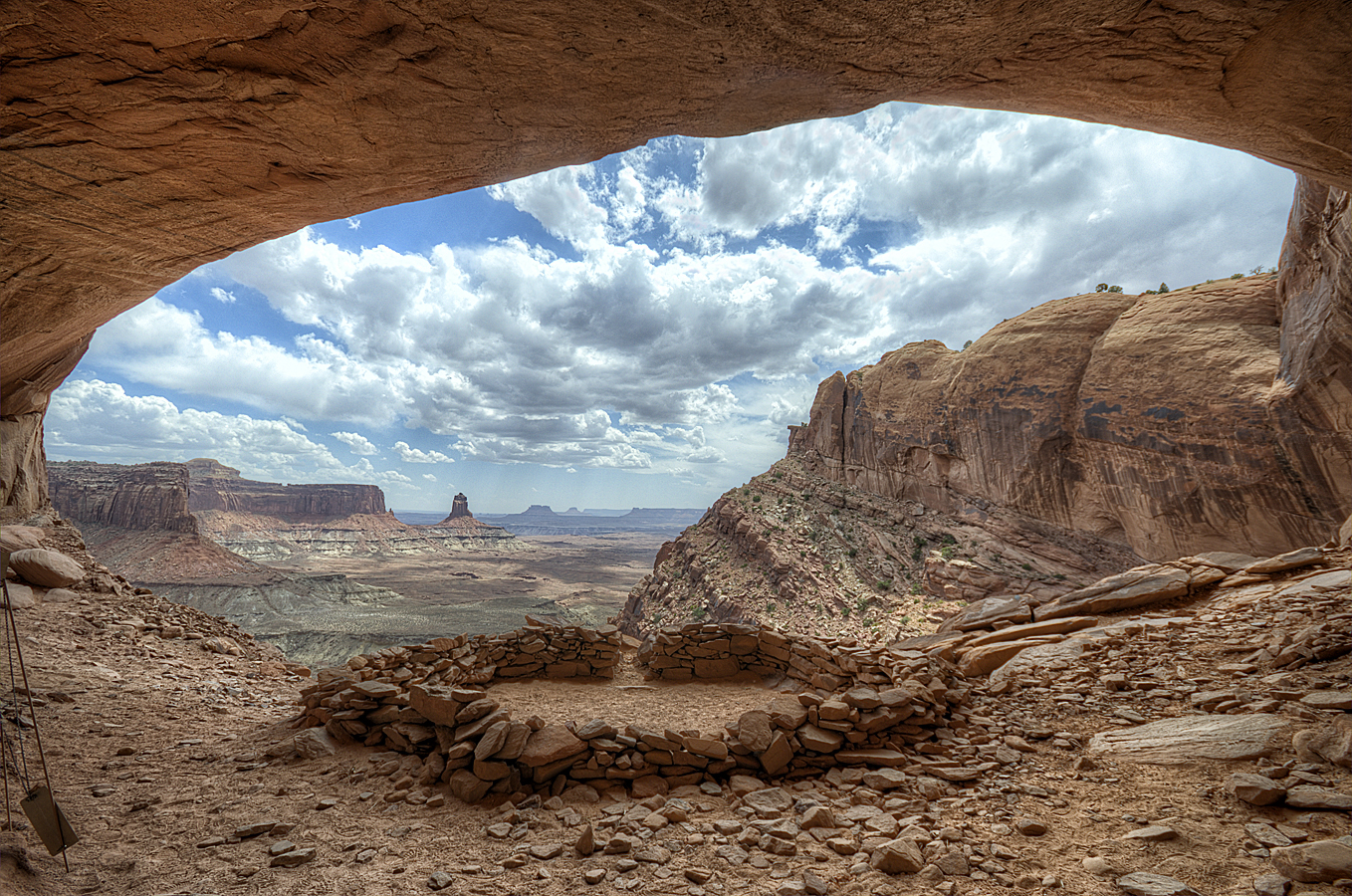
False Kiva cave, 2012

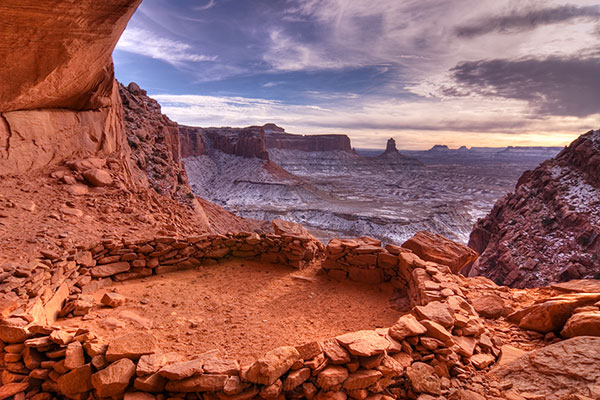
False Kiva stone circle in Canyonlands National Park in Utah, United States.

The False Kiva is a human-made stone circle of unknown origin in a cave in a remote area of Canyonlands National Park, which is located in U.S. state of Utah. It was closed by Canyonlands National Park rangers in early August 2018, as a result of vandalism.

It requires some hiking knowledge or special directions to find.

It has become a popular spot for photographers capturing the Southwest, offering a unique frame for the dramatic thunderstorms or clear skies beyond.

== Origin ==
While located in a naturally occurring alcove, the name False Kiva arises from the uncertainty about the circle of stones' origins and purpose, whether it is really an authentic kiva, a location used for religious purposes.

== Disclosure controversy ==
Debate rages on whether to disclose the exact location of False Kiva as it enjoys a semi-protected status. Park rangers are not required to disclose its location and it does not appear on official maps of the park. Because of the remoteness of the location, the site is not protected from vandalism. Canyonlands National Park's official management policy is the closure of the site to the public via a series of stanchions. Entering the Archeological Site beyond the stanchions is a violation of the Archeological Protection Act of 1979, and violators may be subject to fines and jail time.

Local guides cannot take interested parties to the site, risking losing their permits from the National Park Service if they do so. The trailhead to False Kiva is not marked or signed from park roads, but the route itself is marked by cairns in several locations, and can be accessed without technical climbing equipment.

== Art ==
Logan, Utah artist Keith Bond was commissioned in 2006 to paint a landscape for the Senate Chamber of the Utah State Capitol. He painted False Kiva in a mural titled Ancestral Home which hangs on the western end of the ceiling above the senate floor.

A photograph of False Kiva by Wally Pacholka, entitled "A True Image of False Kiva," was featured on NASA's Astronomy Picture of the Day (APOD) on September 29, 2008, giving an almost otherworldly view into the Milky Way.
