= Kirk's Cabin Complex =

- U.S. National Register of Historic Places
- U.S. Historic district
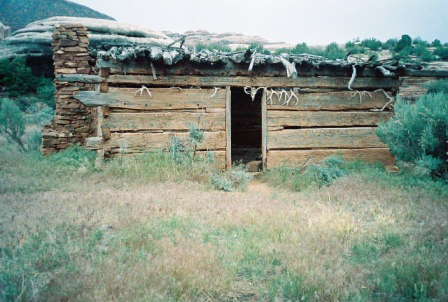

- Location within Utah Location within the United States
- Location: Canyonlands National Park, San Juan County, Utah, USA
- Nearest city: Moab, Utah
- Coordinates: 37°59′16″N 109°44′27″W
- Built: 1889
- Architect: Kirk, Lee
- MPS: Canyonlands National Park MRA
- NRHP reference No.: 88001252
- Added to NRHP: October 07, 1988

The Kirk's Cabin Complex was built by homesteader Rensselaer Lee Kirk around 1890 in what later became Canyonlands National Park in Utah. Kirk was a small rancher who built a log cabin and two corrals at the location, but was unable to make a living there and abandoned the ranch after a few years. Since that time the location was used by cowboys whose herds were grazing in the area, until the late 1960s when the national park was established.
