= D.C.C. & P. Inscription "B" =

- U.S. National Register of Historic Places
- Location within Utah Location within the United States
- Nearest city: Moab, Utah
- Coordinates: 38°11′17″N 109°53′12″W
- Area: less than one acre
- Built: 1889
- Built by: Stanton, R.B.
- MPS: Canyonlands National Park MRA
- NRHP reference No.: 88001251
- Added to NRHP: October 7, 1988

Inscription "B" is a survey mark that was left at the confluence of the Colorado and Green rivers in Utah in 1889 by the Robert Brewster Stanton party as they surveyed a railway route.

The inscription reads:

STA 84. 89 + 50

D. C. C. &.P. R.R.

May 4th 1 8 8 9

Stanton and his crew were surveying for a proposed railroad, the Denver, Colorado Canyon and Pacific Railroad (D.C.C. & P.), which was planned to run from Grand Junction, Colorado to the Gulf of California. The railroad was never built. The inscription measures about 25 inches (64 cm) by 11 inches (28 cm) on a boulder about 100 feet (30 m) from the Green River.

The site was placed on the National Register of Historic Places on October 7, 1988.
