= Canyonlands National Park =

National park in Utah, United States

- IUCN category II (national park)
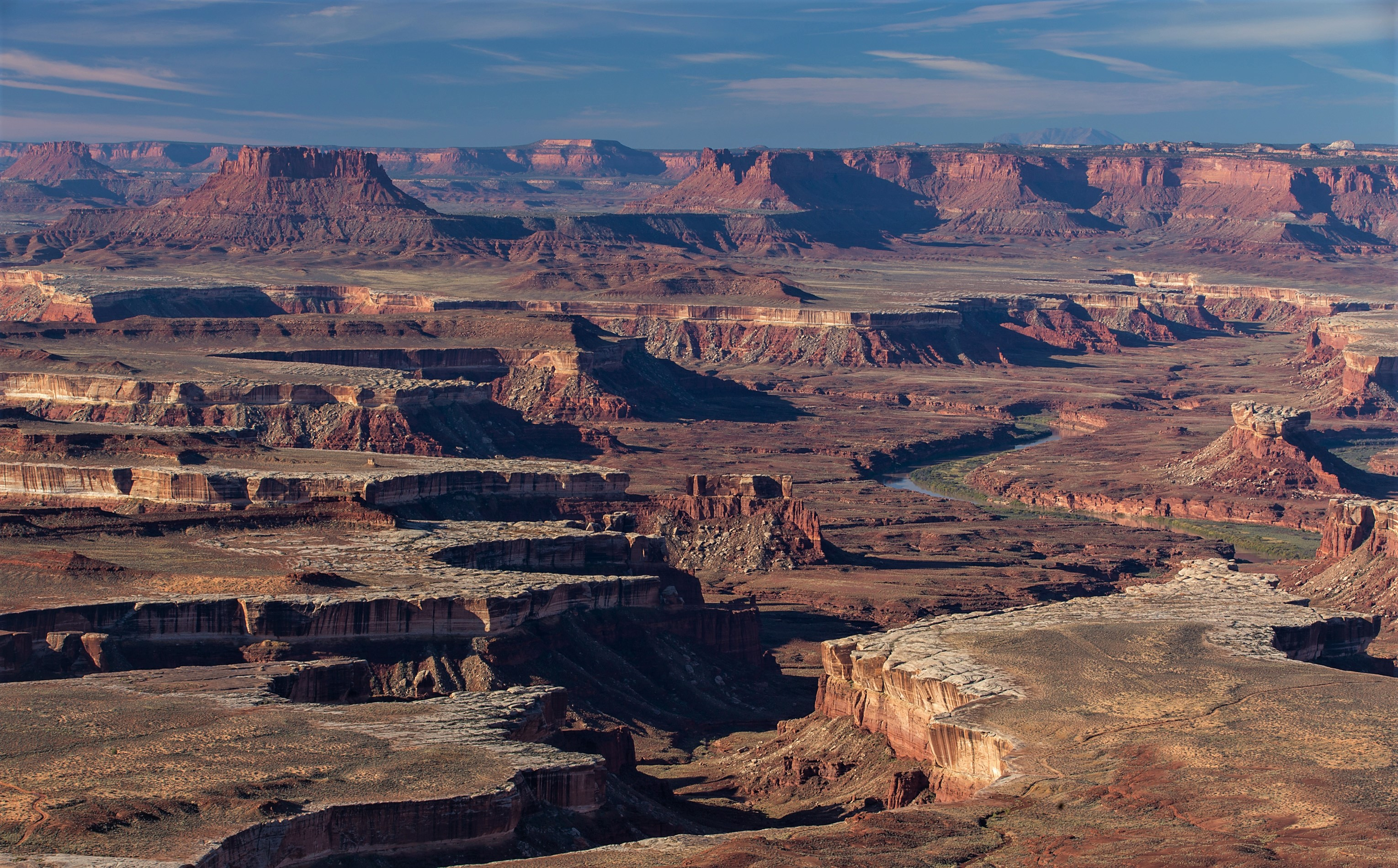
- Looking over the Green River from Island in the Sky
- Interactive map of Canyonlands National Park
- Location: San Juan, Wayne, Garfield, and Grand counties, Utah, United States
- Nearest city: Moab, Utah
- Coordinates: 38°10′01″N 109°45′35″W
- Area: 337,598 acres (1,366.21 km^{2})
- Established: September 12, 1964; 62 years ago
- Visitors: 818,492 (in 2024)
- Governing body: National Park Service
- Website: nps.gov/cany

Canyonlands National Park is a national park of the United States located in southeastern Utah near the town of Moab. The park preserves a colorful landscape eroded into numerous canyons, mesas, and buttes by the Colorado River, the Green River, and their respective tributaries. Legislation creating the park was signed into law by President Lyndon B. Johnson on September 12, 1964.

The park is divided into four districts: the Island in the Sky, the Needles, the Maze, and the combined rivers—the Green and Colorado—which carved two large canyons into the Colorado Plateau. While these areas share a primitive desert atmosphere, each retains its own character. Author Edward Abbey, a frequent visitor, described the Canyonlands as "the most weird, wonderful, magical place on earth—there is nothing else like it anywhere".

== History ==
In the early 1950s, Bates Wilson, then superintendent of Arches National Monument, began exploring the area to the south and west of Moab, Utah. After seeing what is now known as the Needles District of Canyonlands National Park, Wilson began advocating for the establishment of a new national park that would include the Needles. Additional explorations by Wilson and others expanded the areas proposed for inclusion into the new national park to include the confluence of Green and Colorado rivers, the Maze District, and Horseshoe Canyon.

In 1961, Secretary of the Interior Stewart Udall was scheduled to address a conference at Grand Canyon National Park. On his flight to the conference, he flew over the Confluence (where the Colorado and Green rivers meet). The view apparently sparked Udall's interest in Wilson's proposal for a new national park in that area and Udall began promoting the establishment of Canyonlands National Park.

Utah Senator Frank Moss first introduced legislation in Congress to create Canyonlands National Park. His legislation attempted to satisfy both nature preservationists' and commercial developers' interests. Over the next four years, his proposal was struck down, debated, revised, and reintroduced to Congress many times before being passed and signed into law.

In September 1964, after several years of debate, President Lyndon B. Johnson signed Pub. L. 88–590, which established Canyonlands National Park as a new national park. Bates Wilson became the first superintendent of the new park and is often referred to as the "Father of Canyonlands".

== Recreation ==
Canyonlands is a popular recreational destination. Since 2007, more than 400,000 people have visited the park each year, with a record of 911,594 visitors in 2021. The geography of the park is well suited to a number of different recreational uses. Hikers, mountain bikers, backpackers, and four-wheelers all enjoy traveling the rugged, remote trails within the Park. The White Rim Road traverses the White Rim Sandstone level of the park between the rivers and the Island in the Sky. Since 2015, day-use permits must be obtained before travelling on the White Rim Road due to the increasing popularity of driving and bicycling along it. The park service's intent is to provide a better wilderness experience for all visitors while minimizing impacts on the natural surroundings. Canyonlands National Park upholds a strict no-hunting policy.

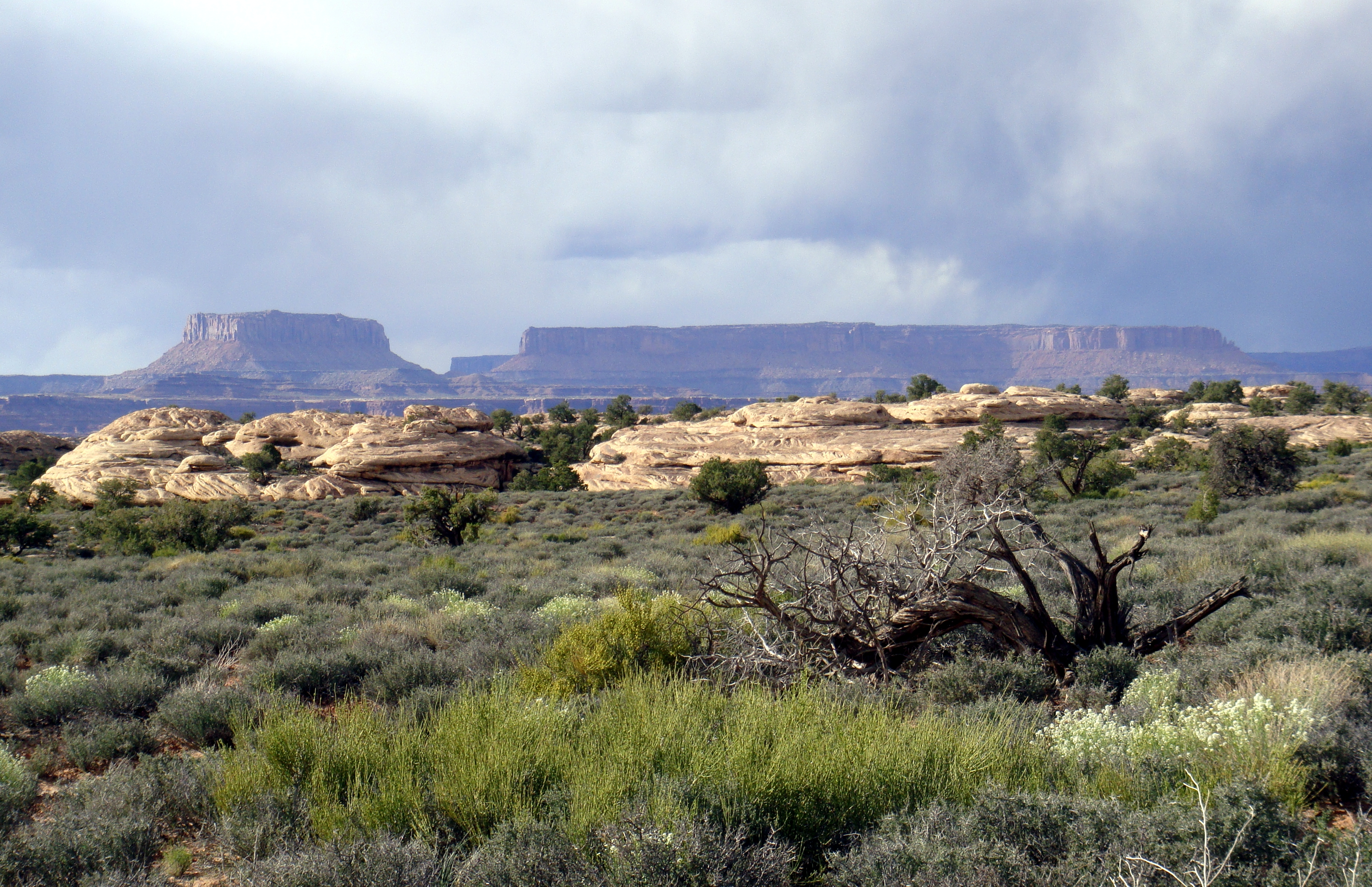
The Island in the Sky mesa and Junction Butte from the Needles district

As of 2016, the Island in the Sky district, with its proximity to the Moab, Utah area, attracts 76.7 percent of total park visitors. The Needles district is the second most visited, drawing 20.7 percent of visitors. The remote Maze district accounts for only about 1.5 percent of visitors, while river rafters and other river users account for the remaining 1.1 percent of total park visitation.

Rafters and kayakers float the calm stretches of the Green River and Colorado River above the Confluence. Below the Confluence, Cataract Canyon contains powerful whitewater rapids, similar to those found in the Grand Canyon. However, since there is no large impoundment on the Colorado River above Canyonlands National Park, river flow through the Confluence is determined by snowmelt, not management. As a result, and in combination with Cataract Canyon's unique graben geology, this stretch of river offers the largest whitewater in North America in heavy snow years.

Political compromise at the time of the park's creation limited the protected area to an arbitrary portion of the Canyonlands basin. Conservationists hope to complete the park by bringing the boundaries up to the high sandstone rims that form the natural border of the Canyonlands landscape.

On March 27, 2020, Canyonlands National Park was closed to help prevent the spread of COVID-19.

== Geography ==
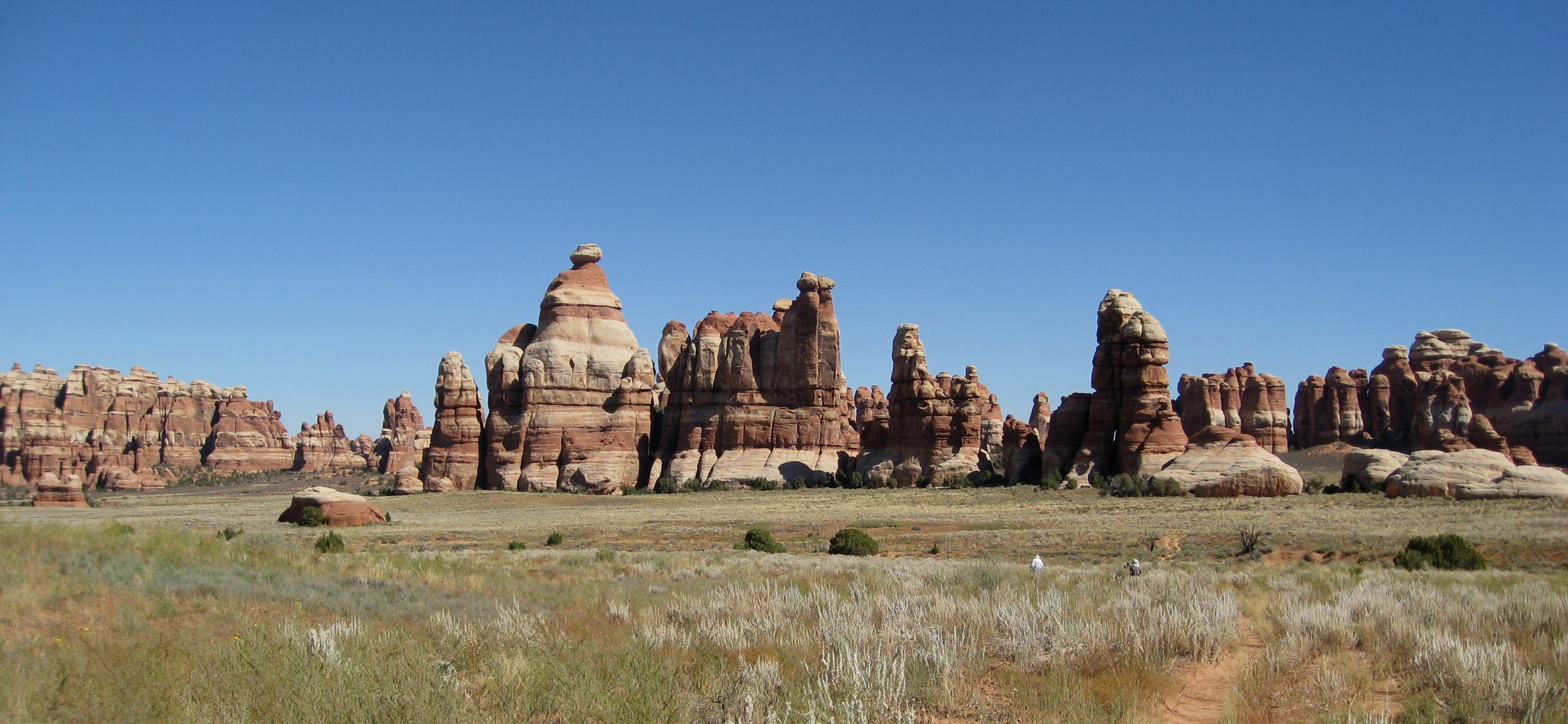
Chesler Park in the Needles

The Colorado River and Green River combine within the park, dividing it into three districts called the Island in the Sky, the Needles, and the Maze. The Colorado River flows through Cataract Canyon below its confluence with the Green River.

The Island in the Sky district is a broad and level mesa in the northern section of the park, between the Colorado and Green rivers. The district has many viewpoints overlooking the White Rim, a sandstone bench 1,200 feet (370 m) below the Island, and the rivers, which are another 1,000 feet (300 m) below the White Rim.

The Needles district is located south of the Island in the Sky, on the east side of the Colorado River. The district is named for the red and white banded rock pinnacles which are a major feature of the area. Various other naturally sculpted rock formations are also within this district, including grabens, potholes, and arches. Unlike Arches National Park, where many arches are accessible by short to moderate hikes, most of the arches in the Needles district lie in backcountry canyons, requiring long hikes or four-wheel drive trips to reach them.

The Ancestral Puebloans inhabited this area and some of their stone and mud dwellings are well-preserved, although the items and tools they used were mostly removed by looters. The Ancestral Puebloans also created rock art in the form of petroglyphs, most notably on Newspaper Rock along the Needles access road.

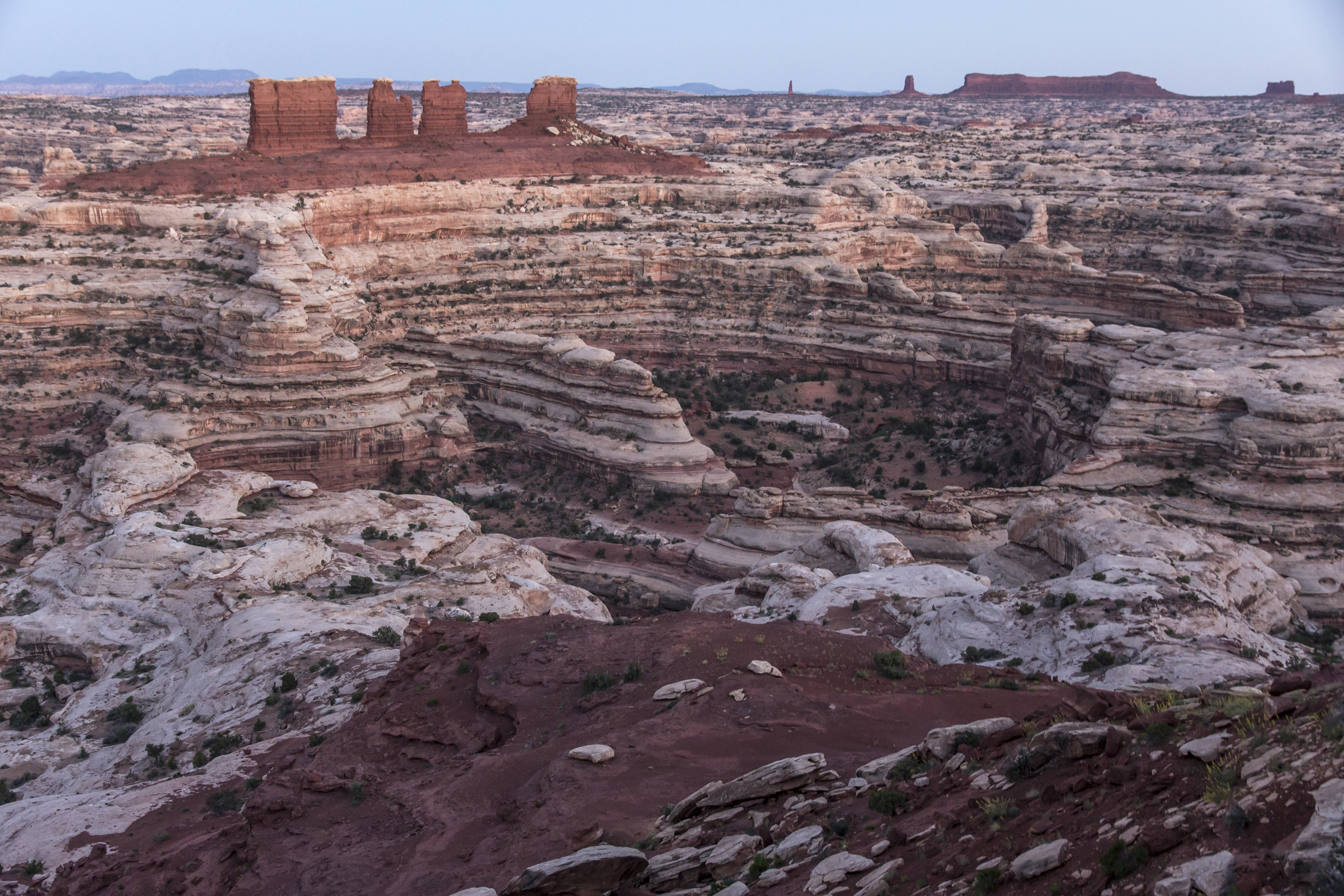
The Chocolate Drops buttes in the Maze district

The Maze district is located west of the Colorado and Green rivers. The Maze is the least accessible section of the park, and one of the most remote and inaccessible areas of the United States.

A geographically detached section of the park located north of the Maze district, Horseshoe Canyon contains panels of rock art made by hunter-gatherers from the Late Archaic Period (2000–1000 BC) pre-dating the Ancestral Puebloans. Originally called Barrier Canyon, Horseshoe's artifacts, dwellings, pictographs, and murals are some of the oldest in America. The images depicting horses date from after 1540 AD, when the Spanish reintroduced horses to America.

Since the 1950s, scientists have been studying an area of 200 acres (81 ha) completely surrounded by cliffs. The cliffs have prevented cattle from ever grazing on the area's 62 acres (25 ha) of grassland. According to the scientists, the site may contain the largest undisturbed grassland in the Four Corners region. Studies have continued biannually since the mid-1990s. The area has been closed to the public since 1993 to maintain the nearly pristine environment.

== Nature ==
=== Fauna ===
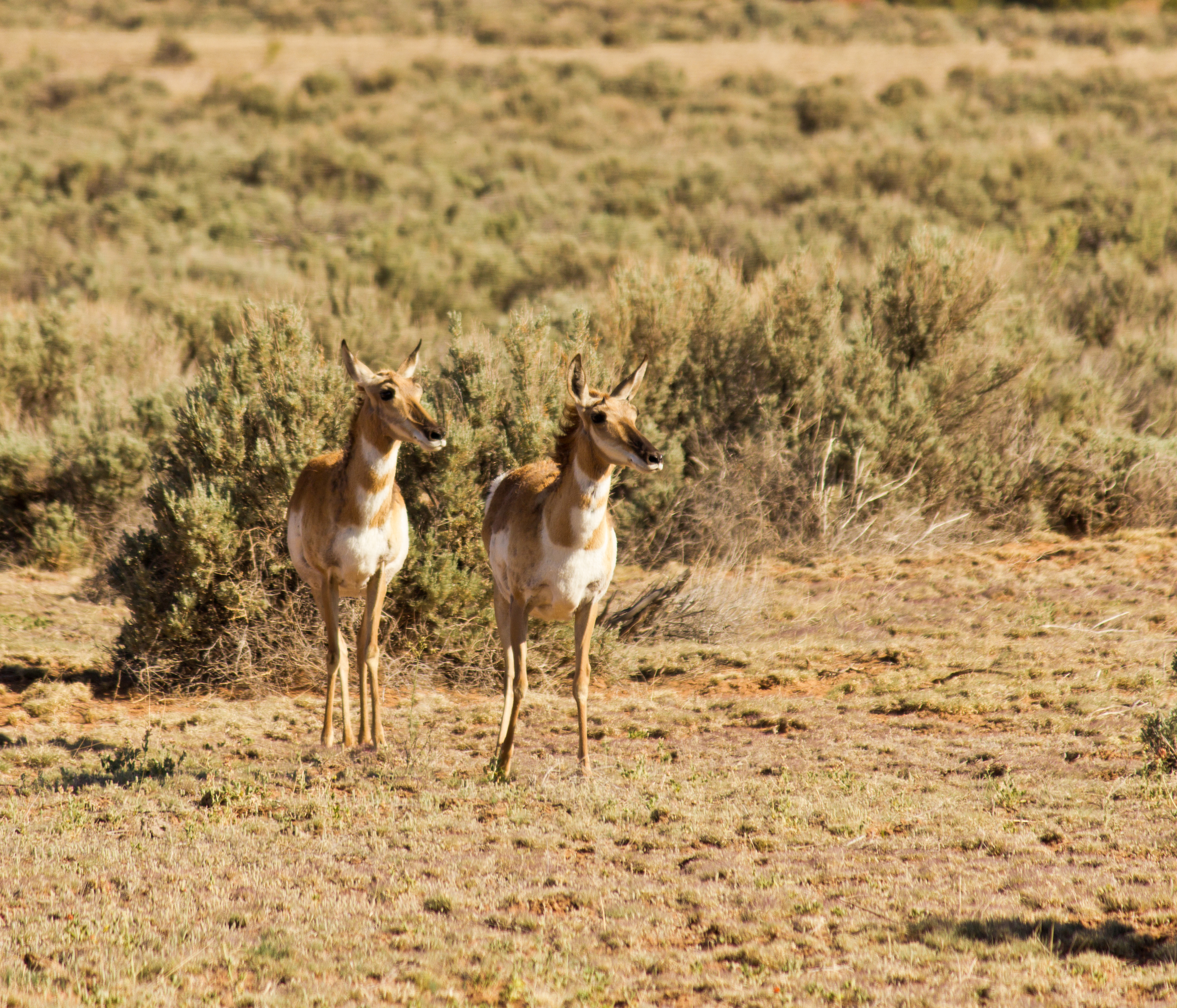
Pronghorns are colloquially referred to as antelope due to their resemblance, but are not closely related to Old World antelopes

Mammals that roam this park include black bears, coyotes, skunks, bats, elk, foxes, bobcats, badgers, ring-tailed cats, pronghorns, desert bighorn sheep, and cougars. Desert cottontails, kangaroo rats and mule deer are commonly seen by visitors.

At least 273 species of birds inhabit the park. A variety of hawks and eagles are found, including the Cooper's hawk, the northern goshawk, the sharp-shinned hawk, the red-tailed hawk, the golden and bald eagles, the rough-legged hawk, the Swainson's hawk, and the northern harrier. Several species of owls are found, including the great horned owl, the northern saw-whet owl, the western screech owl, and the Mexican spotted owl. Grebes, woodpeckers, ravens, herons, flycatchers, crows, bluebirds, wrens, warblers, blackbirds, orioles, goldfinches, swallows, sparrows, ducks, quail, grouse, pheasants, hummingbirds, falcons, gulls, and ospreys are some of the other birds that can be found.

Several reptiles can be found, including eleven species of lizards and eight species of snake (including the midget faded rattlesnake). The common kingsnake and prairie rattlesnake have been reported in the park, but not confirmed by the National Park Service.

The park is home to six confirmed amphibian species, including the red-spotted toad, Woodhouse's toad, American bullfrog, northern leopard frog, Great Basin spadefoot toad, and tiger salamander. The canyon tree frog was reported to be in the park in 2000, but was not confirmed during a study in 2004.

=== Flora ===
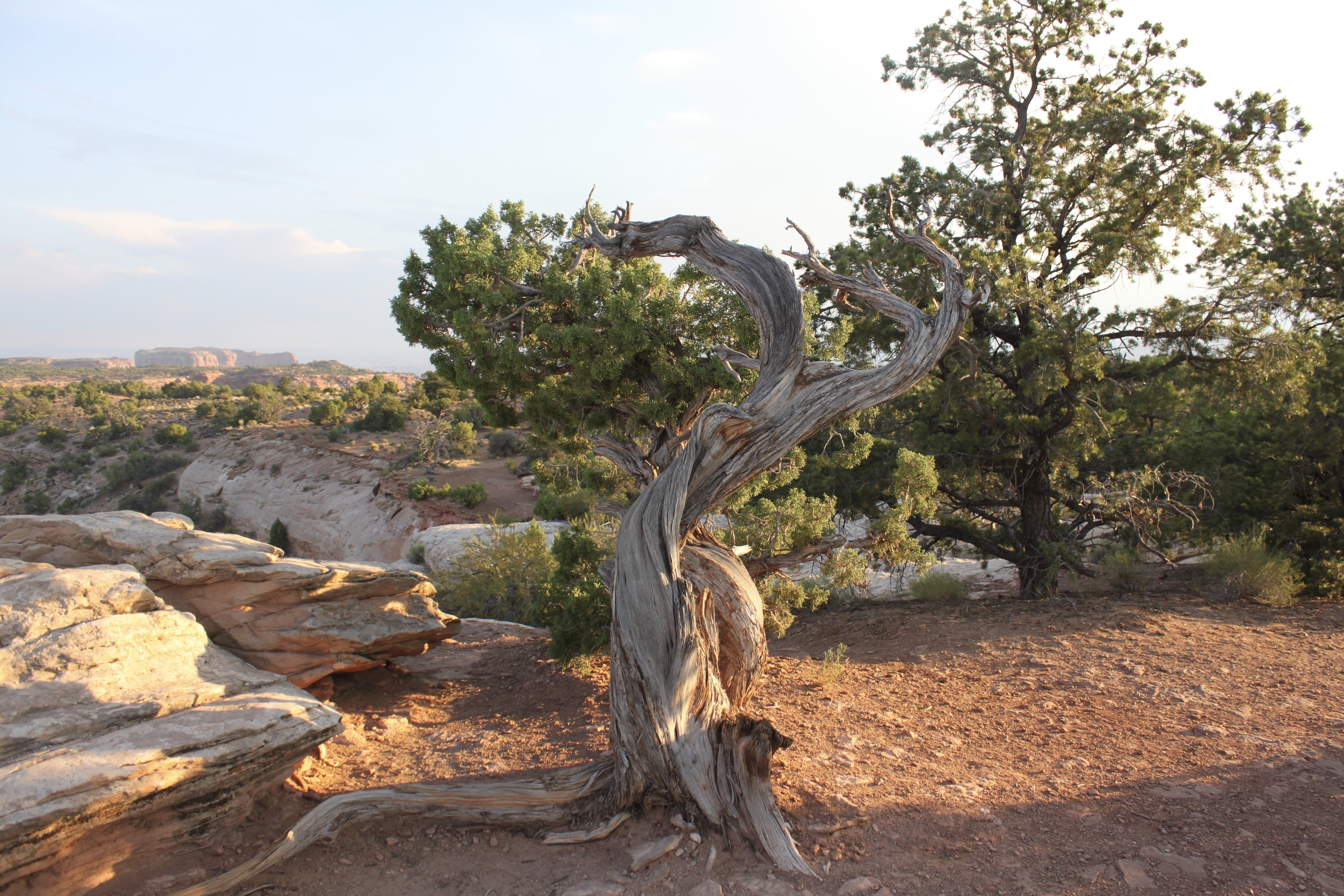
Utah juniper

Canyonlands National Park contains a wide variety of plant life, including 11 cactus species, 20 moss species, liverworts, grasses and wildflowers. Varieties of trees include netleaf hackberry, Russian olive, Utah juniper, pinyon pine, tamarisk, and Fremont's cottonwood. Shrubs include Mormon tea, blackbrush, four-wing saltbush, cliffrose, littleleaf mountain mahogany, and snakeweed

Cryptobiotic soil is the foundation of life in Canyonlands, providing nitrogen fixation and moisture for plant seeds.

== Climate ==
According to the Köppen climate classification system, Canyonlands National Park has a cold semi-arid climate ("BSk"). The plant hardiness zones at the Island in the Sky and Needles District Visitor Centers are 7a with an average annual extreme minimum air temperature of 4.0 °F (-15.6 °C) and 2.9 °F (-16.2 °C), respectively.

The National Weather Service has maintained two cooperative weather stations in the park since June 1965. Official data documents the desert climate with less than 10 inches (250 millimetres) of annual rainfall, as well as hot, mostly dry summers and cold, occasionally wet winters. Snowfall is generally light during the winter.

The station in The Neck region reports an average January temperature of 29.6 °F and an average July temperature of 79.3 °F. Average July temperatures range from a high of 90.8 °F (32.7 °C) to a low of 67.9 °F (19.9 °C). There are an average of 45.7 days with highs of 90 °F (32 °C) or higher and an average of 117.3 days with lows of 32 °F (0 °C) or lower. The highest recorded temperature was 105 °F (41 °C) on July 15, 2005, and the lowest recorded temperature was −13 °F (−25 °C) on February 6, 1989. Average annual precipitation is 9.33 inches (237 mm). There are an average of 59 days with measurable precipitation. The wettest year was 1984, with 13.66 in (347 mm), and the driest year was 1989, with 4.63 in (118 mm). The most precipitation in one month was 5.19 in (132 mm) in October 2006. The most precipitation in 24 hours was 1.76 in (45 mm) on April 9, 1978. Average annual snowfall is 22.8 in (58 cm). The most snowfall in one year was 47.4 in (120 cm) in 1975, and the most snowfall in one month was 27.0 in (69 cm) in January 1978.

The station in The Needles region reports an average January temperature of 29.7 °F and an average July temperature of 79.1 °F. Average July temperatures range from a high of 95.4 °F (35.2 °C) to a low of 62.4 °F (16.9 °C). There are an average of 75.4 days with highs of 90 °F (32 °C) or higher and an average of 143.6 days with lows of 32 °F (0 °C) or lower. The highest recorded temperature was 107 °F (42 °C) on July 13, 1971, and the lowest recorded temperature was −16 °F (−27 °C) on January 16, 1971. Average annual precipitation is 8.49 in (216 mm). There are an average of 56 days with measurable precipitation. The wettest year was 1969, with 11.19 in (284 mm), and the driest year was 1989, with 4.25 in (108 mm). The most precipitation in one month was 4.43 in (113 mm) in October 1972. The most precipitation in 24 hours was 1.56 in (40 mm) on September 17, 1999. Average annual snowfall is 14.4 in (37 cm). The most snowfall in one year was 39.3 in (100 cm) in 1975, and the most snowfall in one month was 24.0 in (61 cm) in March 1985.

Climate data for Canyonlands – The Neck, Utah, 1991–2020 normals, extremes 1965–present
Month	Jan	Feb	Mar	Apr	May	Jun	Jul	Aug	Sep	Oct	Nov	Dec	Year
Record high °F (°C)	58 (14)	67 (19)	86 (30)	84 (29)	97 (36)	102 (39)	105 (41)	101 (38)	98 (37)	89 (32)	72 (22)	62 (17)	105 (41)
Mean maximum °F (°C)	48.0 (8.9)	55.9 (13.3)	68.5 (20.3)	77.2 (25.1)	86.5 (30.3)	95.4 (35.2)	98.8 (37.1)	95.6 (35.3)	89.9 (32.2)	79.7 (26.5)	63.1 (17.3)	50.8 (10.4)	99.4 (37.4)
Mean daily maximum °F (°C)	36.8 (2.7)	43.2 (6.2)	54.2 (12.3)	62.0 (16.7)	72.4 (22.4)	84.6 (29.2)	90.8 (32.7)	87.8 (31.0)	79.0 (26.1)	64.6 (18.1)	49.1 (9.5)	36.9 (2.7)	63.5 (17.5)
Daily mean °F (°C)	29.6 (−1.3)	35.2 (1.8)	44.5 (6.9)	51.1 (10.6)	61.3 (16.3)	73.1 (22.8)	79.3 (26.3)	76.8 (24.9)	68.0 (20.0)	54.3 (12.4)	40.8 (4.9)	29.7 (−1.3)	53.6 (12.0)
Mean daily minimum °F (°C)	22.3 (−5.4)	27.3 (−2.6)	34.9 (1.6)	40.1 (4.5)	50.2 (10.1)	61.7 (16.5)	67.9 (19.9)	65.7 (18.7)	57.0 (13.9)	43.9 (6.6)	32.6 (0.3)	22.6 (−5.2)	43.8 (6.6)
Mean minimum °F (°C)	10.2 (−12.1)	14.2 (−9.9)	20.7 (−6.3)	25.8 (−3.4)	34.0 (1.1)	45.5 (7.5)	56.5 (13.6)	55.4 (13.0)	42.3 (5.7)	27.0 (−2.8)	16.5 (−8.6)	10.3 (−12.1)	6.6 (−14.1)
Record low °F (°C)	−7 (−22)	−13 (−25)	0 (−18)	14 (−10)	22 (−6)	26 (−3)	41 (5)	41 (5)	25 (−4)	9 (−13)	6 (−14)	−10 (−23)	−13 (−25)
Average precipitation inches (mm)	0.55 (14)	0.58 (15)	0.75 (19)	0.68 (17)	0.87 (22)	0.36 (9.1)	0.91 (23)	1.16 (29)	1.00 (25)	1.22 (31)	0.55 (14)	0.70 (18)	9.33 (236.1)
Average snowfall inches (cm)	6.1 (15)	3.5 (8.9)	3.0 (7.6)	0.3 (0.76)	0.1 (0.25)	0.0 (0.0)	0.0 (0.0)	0.0 (0.0)	0.0 (0.0)	0.1 (0.25)	3.2 (8.1)	6.5 (17)	22.8 (57.86)
Average extreme snow depth inches (cm)	4.9 (12)	4.0 (10)	2.1 (5.3)	0.6 (1.5)	0.1 (0.25)	0.0 (0.0)	0.0 (0.0)	0.0 (0.0)	0.0 (0.0)	0.4 (1.0)	1.9 (4.8)	4.6 (12)	6.5 (17)
Average precipitation days (≥ 0.01 in)	4.4	4.5	4.6	5.2	5.4	2.4	5.9	6.4	6.2	5.7	4.3	4.4	59.4
Average snowy days (≥ 0.1 in)	3.8	2.5	1.7	0.5	0.1	0.0	0.0	0.0	0.0	0.3	1.7	3.6	14.2
Source: NOAA

Climate data for Hans Flat Ranger Station, Utah, 1991–2020 normals, extremes 1980–present
Month	Jan	Feb	Mar	Apr	May	Jun	Jul	Aug	Sep	Oct	Nov	Dec	Year
Record high °F (°C)	55 (13)	66 (19)	81 (27)	82 (28)	92 (33)	98 (37)	101 (38)	98 (37)	95 (35)	88 (31)	70 (21)	62 (17)	101 (38)
Mean maximum °F (°C)	47.1 (8.4)	53.8 (12.1)	65.3 (18.5)	73.8 (23.2)	82.9 (28.3)	92.1 (33.4)	95.8 (35.4)	93.2 (34.0)	87.5 (30.8)	76.7 (24.8)	61.2 (16.2)	49.3 (9.6)	96.3 (35.7)
Mean daily maximum °F (°C)	35.0 (1.7)	40.3 (4.6)	50.1 (10.1)	57.3 (14.1)	67.8 (19.9)	80.2 (26.8)	86.6 (30.3)	83.7 (28.7)	74.9 (23.8)	60.9 (16.1)	46.5 (8.1)	35.1 (1.7)	59.9 (15.5)
Daily mean °F (°C)	28.2 (−2.1)	32.8 (0.4)	41.3 (5.2)	47.3 (8.5)	57.7 (14.3)	69.5 (20.8)	75.6 (24.2)	73.1 (22.8)	65.0 (18.3)	51.6 (10.9)	38.7 (3.7)	28.2 (−2.1)	50.8 (10.4)
Mean daily minimum °F (°C)	21.4 (−5.9)	25.2 (−3.8)	32.4 (0.2)	37.2 (2.9)	47.5 (8.6)	58.8 (14.9)	64.5 (18.1)	62.6 (17.0)	55.0 (12.8)	42.3 (5.7)	30.8 (−0.7)	21.3 (−5.9)	41.6 (5.3)
Mean minimum °F (°C)	9.1 (−12.7)	12.5 (−10.8)	19.1 (−7.2)	23.8 (−4.6)	32.1 (0.1)	42.9 (6.1)	54.9 (12.7)	54.0 (12.2)	40.5 (4.7)	25.9 (−3.4)	14.8 (−9.6)	9.0 (−12.8)	5.6 (−14.7)
Record low °F (°C)	−5 (−21)	−12 (−24)	9 (−13)	16 (−9)	20 (−7)	31 (−1)	40 (4)	41 (5)	31 (−1)	6 (−14)	3 (−16)	−10 (−23)	−12 (−24)
Average precipitation inches (mm)	0.70 (18)	0.67 (17)	0.84 (21)	0.67 (17)	0.72 (18)	0.37 (9.4)	0.87 (22)	1.09 (28)	0.96 (24)	1.16 (29)	0.76 (19)	0.77 (20)	9.58 (242.4)
Average snowfall inches (cm)	9.2 (23)	7.4 (19)	5.2 (13)	2.9 (7.4)	0.3 (0.76)	0.0 (0.0)	0.0 (0.0)	0.0 (0.0)	0.0 (0.0)	0.7 (1.8)	4.5 (11)	8.3 (21)	38.5 (96.96)
Average extreme snow depth inches (cm)	7.6 (19)	6.6 (17)	3.7 (9.4)	1.5 (3.8)	0.3 (0.76)	0.0 (0.0)	0.0 (0.0)	0.0 (0.0)	0.0 (0.0)	0.6 (1.5)	3.4 (8.6)	5.7 (14)	9.6 (24)
Average precipitation days (≥ 0.01 in)	5.7	6.2	5.8	4.9	5.3	2.7	6.2	7.4	5.6	5.8	4.5	5.6	65.7
Average snowy days (≥ 0.1 in)	4.8	4.9	2.8	1.9	0.2	0.0	0.0	0.0	0.0	0.4	2.7	4.6	22.3
Source 1: NOAA
Source 2: National Weather Service

=== Climate change ===
National parks in the Western United States are more affected by climate change than the country as a whole, and the National Park Service has begun research into how exactly this will affect the ecosystem of Canyonlands National Park and the surrounding areas and ways to protect the park for the future. The mean annual temperature of Canyonlands National Park increased by 2.6 °F (1.4 °C) from 1916 to 2018. It is predicted that if current warming trends continue, the average highs in the park during the summer will be over 100 °F (40 °C) by 2100. In addition to warming, the region has begun to see more severe and frequent droughts which causes native grass cover to decrease and a lower flow of the Colorado River. The flows of the Upper Colorado Basin have decreased by 300,000 acre⋅ft (370,000,000 m^{3}) per year, which has led to a decreased amount of sediment carried by the river and rockier rapids which are more frequently impassable to rafters. The area has also begun to see an earlier spring, which will lead to changes in the timing of leaves and flowers blooming and migrational patterns of wildlife that could lead to food shortages for the wildlife, as well as a longer fire season.

The National Park Service is currently closely monitoring the impacts of climate change in Canyonlands National Park in order to create management strategies that will best help conserve the park's landscapes and ecosystems for the long term. Although the National Park Service's original goal was to preserve landscapes as they were before European colonization, they have now switched to a more adaptive management strategy with the ultimate goal of conserving the biodiversity of the park. The NPS is collaborating with other organizations including the US Geological Survey, local indigenous tribes, and nearby universities in order to create a management plan for the national park. Right now, there is a focus on research into which native plants will be most resistant to climate change so that the park can decide on what to prioritize in conservation efforts. The Canyonlands Natural History Association has been giving money to the US Geological Survey to fund this and other climate related research. They gave $30,000 in 2019 and $61,000 in 2020.

== Geology ==
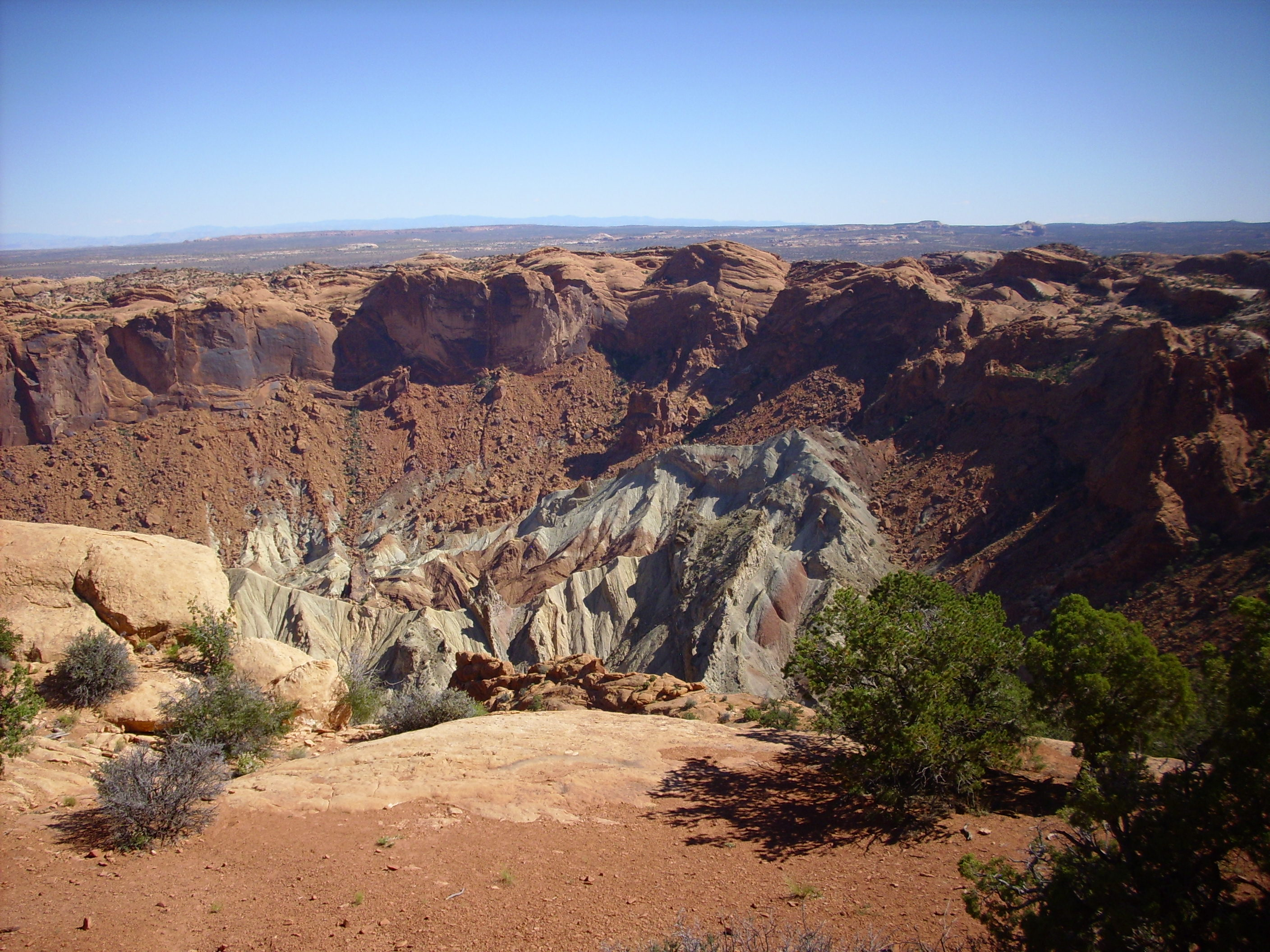
Upheaval Dome is an impact structure, the deeply eroded bottom-most remnants of an impact crater

A subsiding basin and nearby uplifting mountain range (the Uncompahgre) existed in the area in Pennsylvanian time. Seawater trapped in the subsiding basin created thick evaporite deposits by Mid Pennsylvanian. This, along with eroded material from the nearby mountain range, became the Paradox Formation, itself a part of the Hermosa Group. Paradox salt beds started to flow later in the Pennsylvanian and probably continued to move until the end of the Jurassic. Some scientists believe Upheaval Dome was created from Paradox salt bed movement, creating a salt dome, but more modern studies show that the meteorite theory is more likely to be correct.

A warm shallow sea again flooded the region near the end of the Pennsylvanian. Fossil-rich limestones, sandstones, and shales of the gray-colored Honaker Trail Formation resulted. A period of erosion then ensued, creating a break in the geologic record called an unconformity. Early in the Permian an advancing sea laid down the Halgaito Shale. Coastal lowlands later returned to the area, forming the Elephant Canyon Formation.

Large alluvial fans filled the basin where it met the Uncompahgre Mountains, creating the Cutler red beds of iron-rich arkose sandstone. Underwater sand bars and sand dunes on the coast inter-fingered with the red beds and later became the white-colored cliff-forming Cedar Mesa Sandstone. Brightly colored oxidized muds were then deposited, forming the Organ Rock Shale. Coastal sand dunes and marine sand bars once again became dominant, creating the White Rim Sandstone.

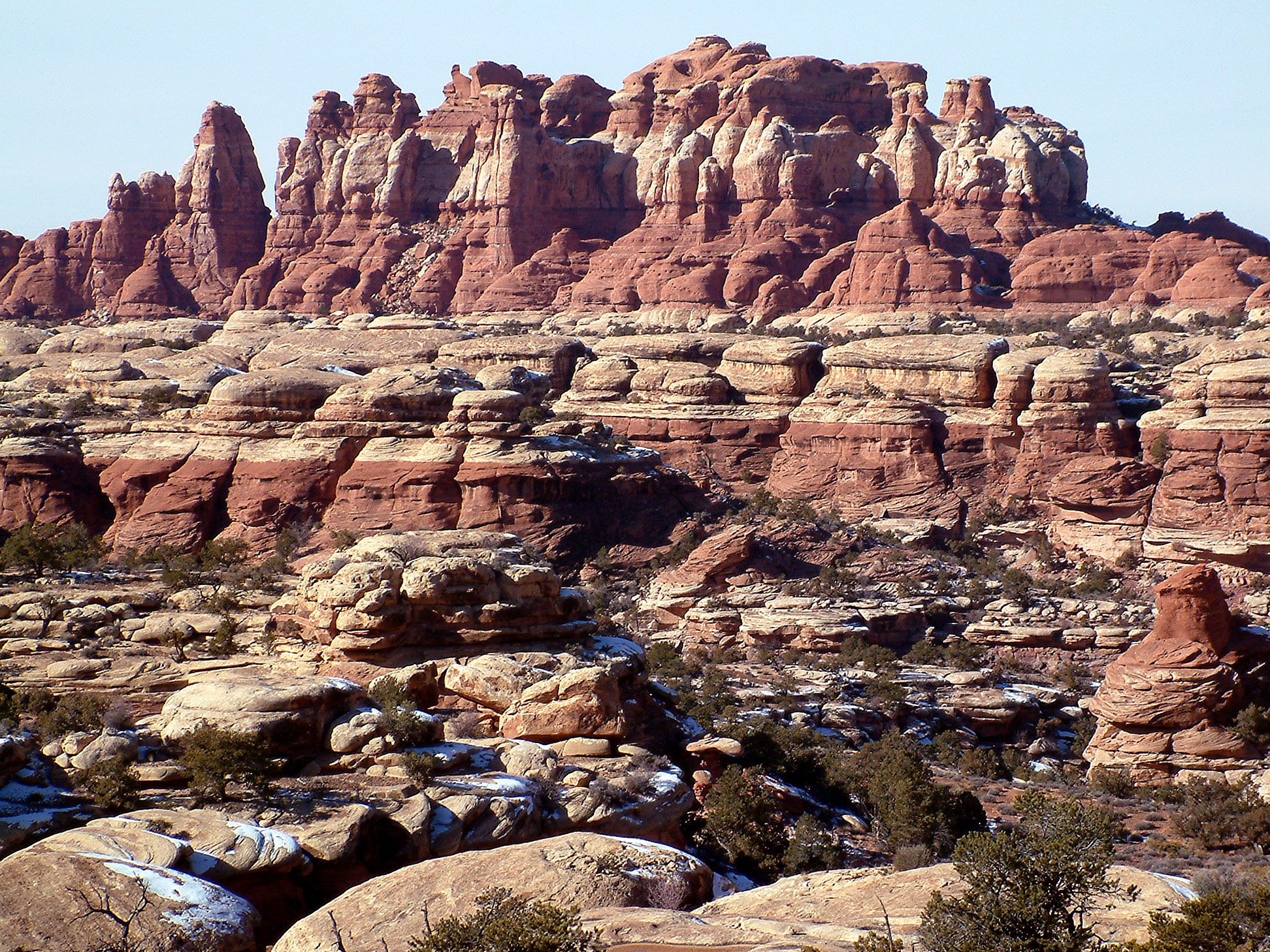
Rock formations in the Needles district

A second unconformity was created after the Permian sea retreated. Flood plains on an expansive lowland covered the eroded surface and mud built up in tidal flats, creating the Moenkopi Formation. Erosion returned, forming a third unconformity. The Chinle Formation was then laid down on top of this eroded surface.

Increasingly dry climates dominated the Triassic. Therefore, sand in the form of sand dunes invaded and became the Wingate Sandstone. For a time climatic conditions became wetter and streams cut channels through the sand dunes, forming the Kayenta Formation. Arid conditions returned to the region with a vengeance; a large desert spread over much of western North America and later became the Navajo Sandstone. A fourth unconformity was created by a period of erosion.

Mud flats returned, forming the Carmel Formation, and the Entrada Sandstone was laid down next. A long period of erosion stripped away most of the San Rafael Group in the area, along with any formations that may have been laid down in the Cretaceous period.

The Laramide orogeny started to uplift the Rocky Mountains 70 million years ago and with it, the Canyonlands region. Erosion intensified and when the Colorado River Canyon reached the salt beds of the Paradox Formation the overlying strata extended toward the river canyon, forming features such as The Grabens. Increased precipitation during the ice ages of the Pleistocene quickened the rate of canyon excavation along with other erosion. Similar types of erosion are ongoing, but occur at a slower rate.

== Gallery ==
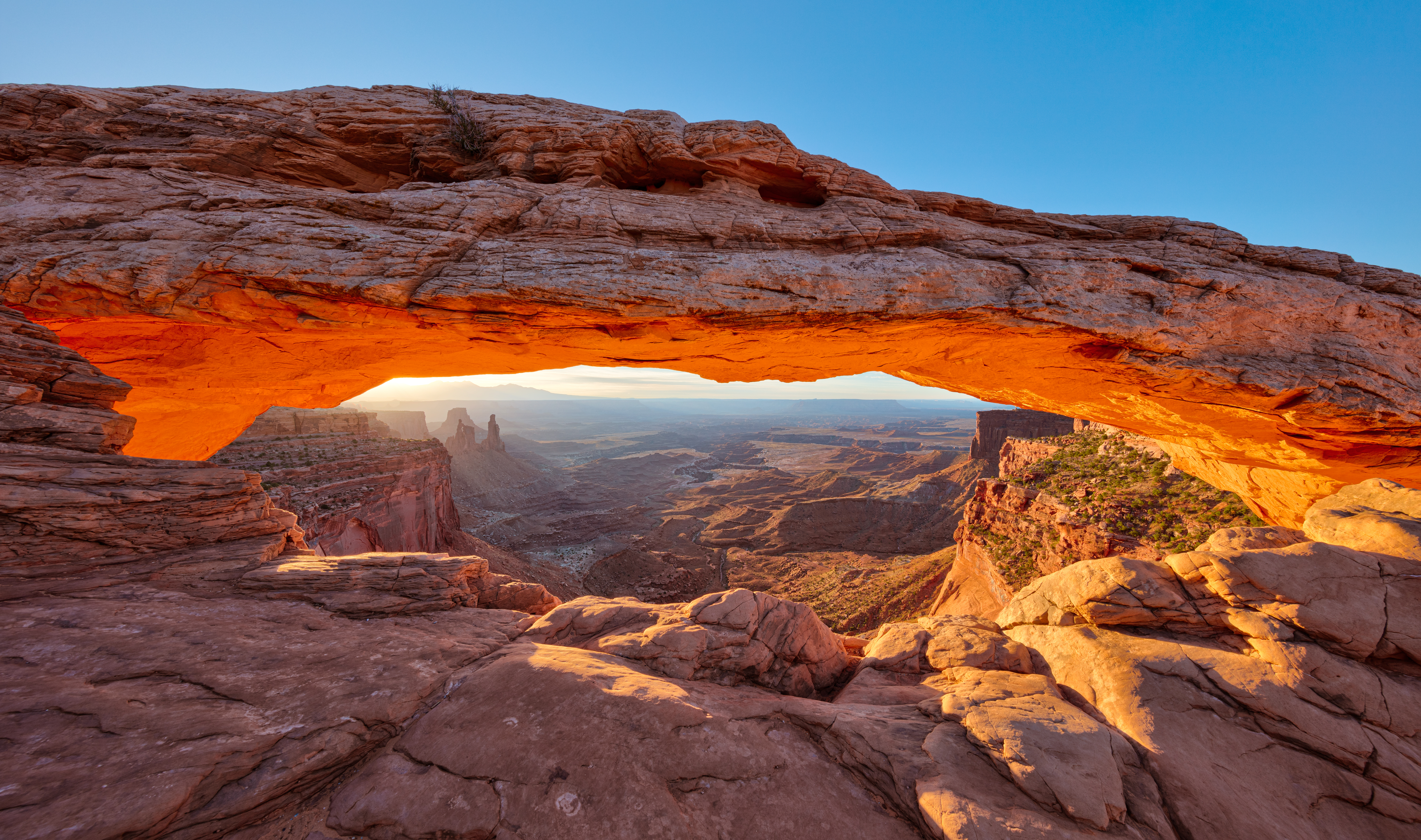
Mesa Arch at sunrise, Island in the Sky district

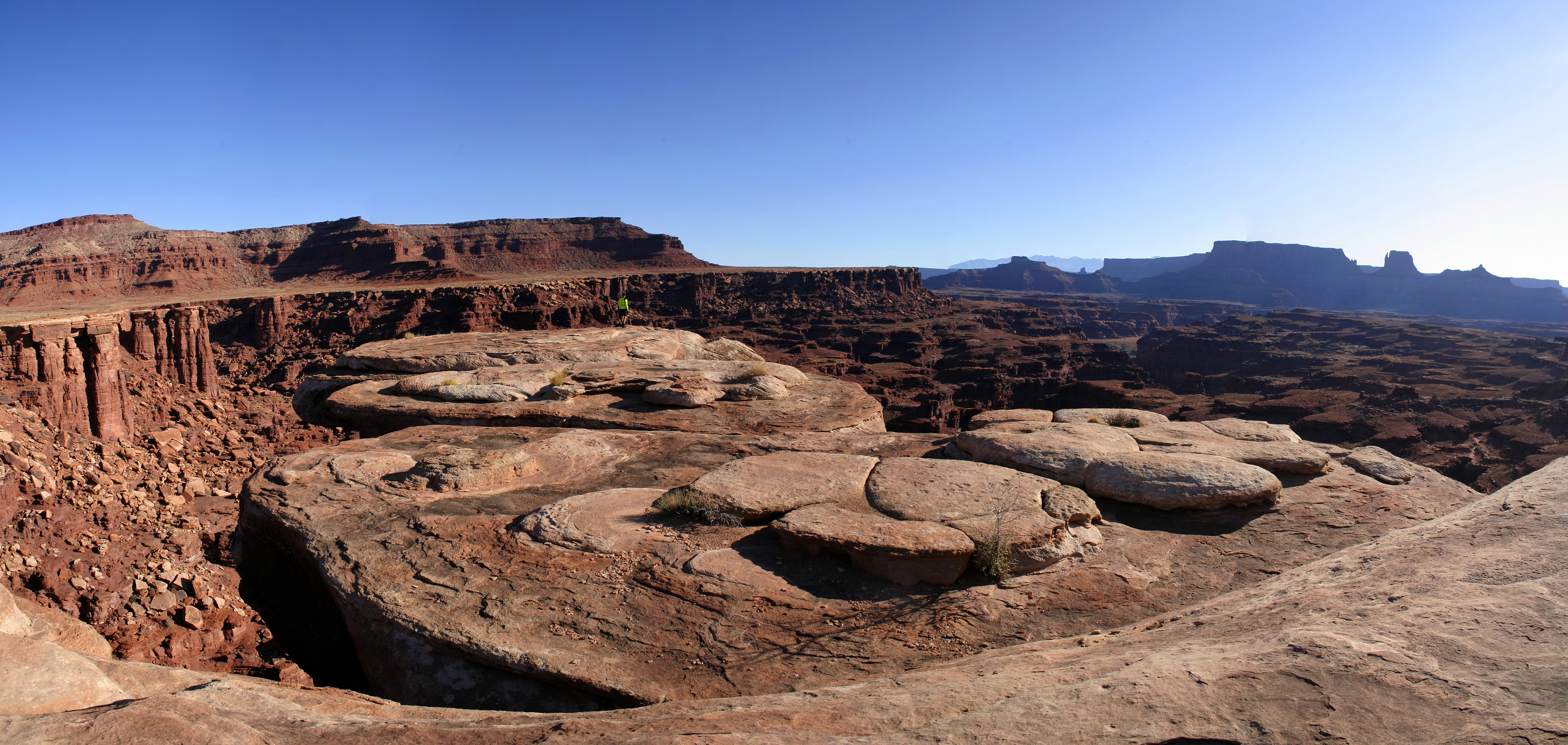
The White Rim Sandstone

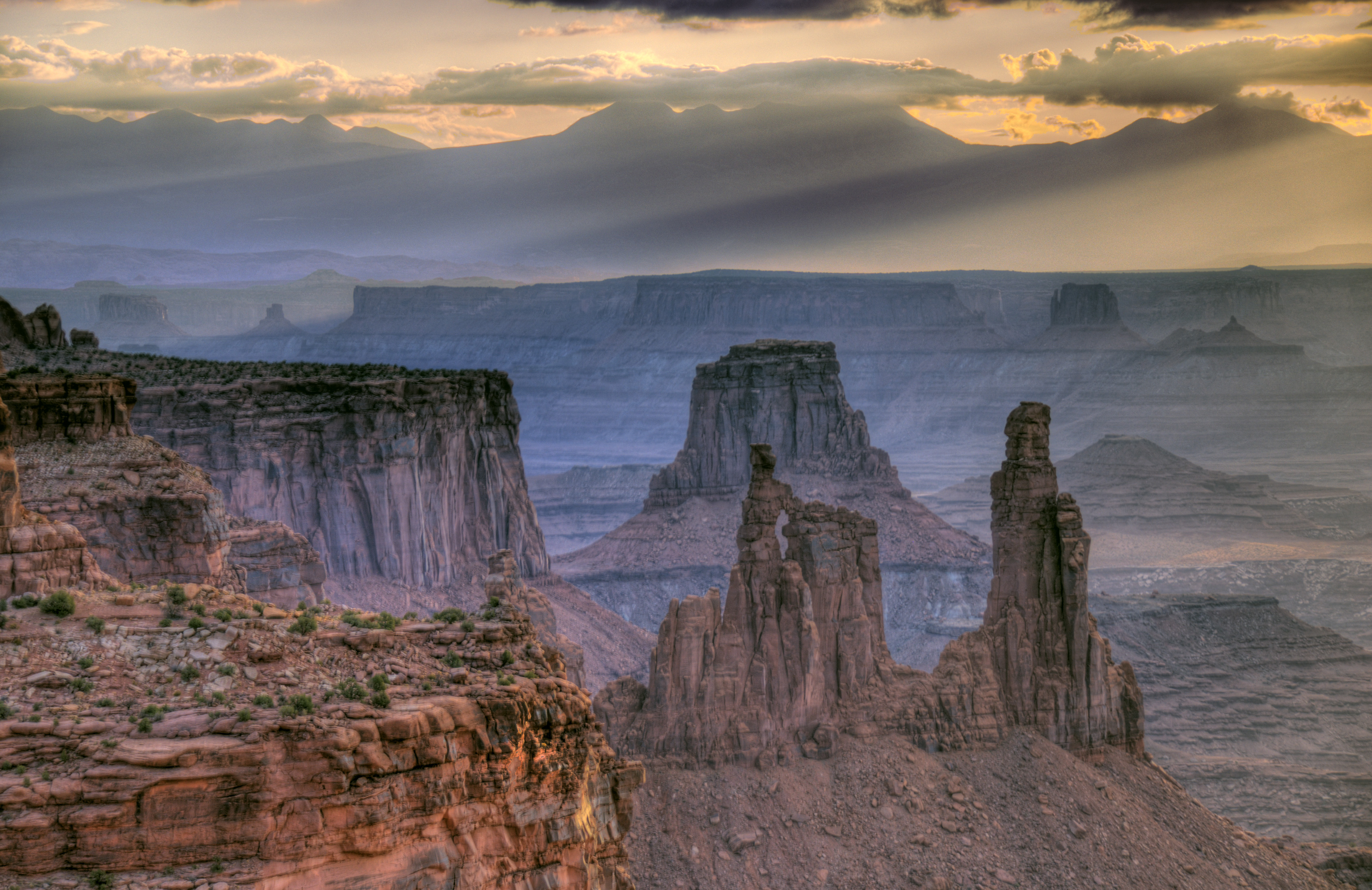
Canyonlands at daybreak. Washer Woman and Monster Tower in foreground, Airport Tower behind. La Sal Mountains in background

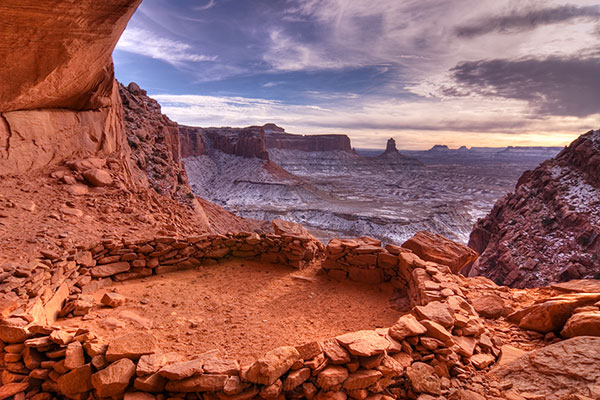
False Kiva stone circle

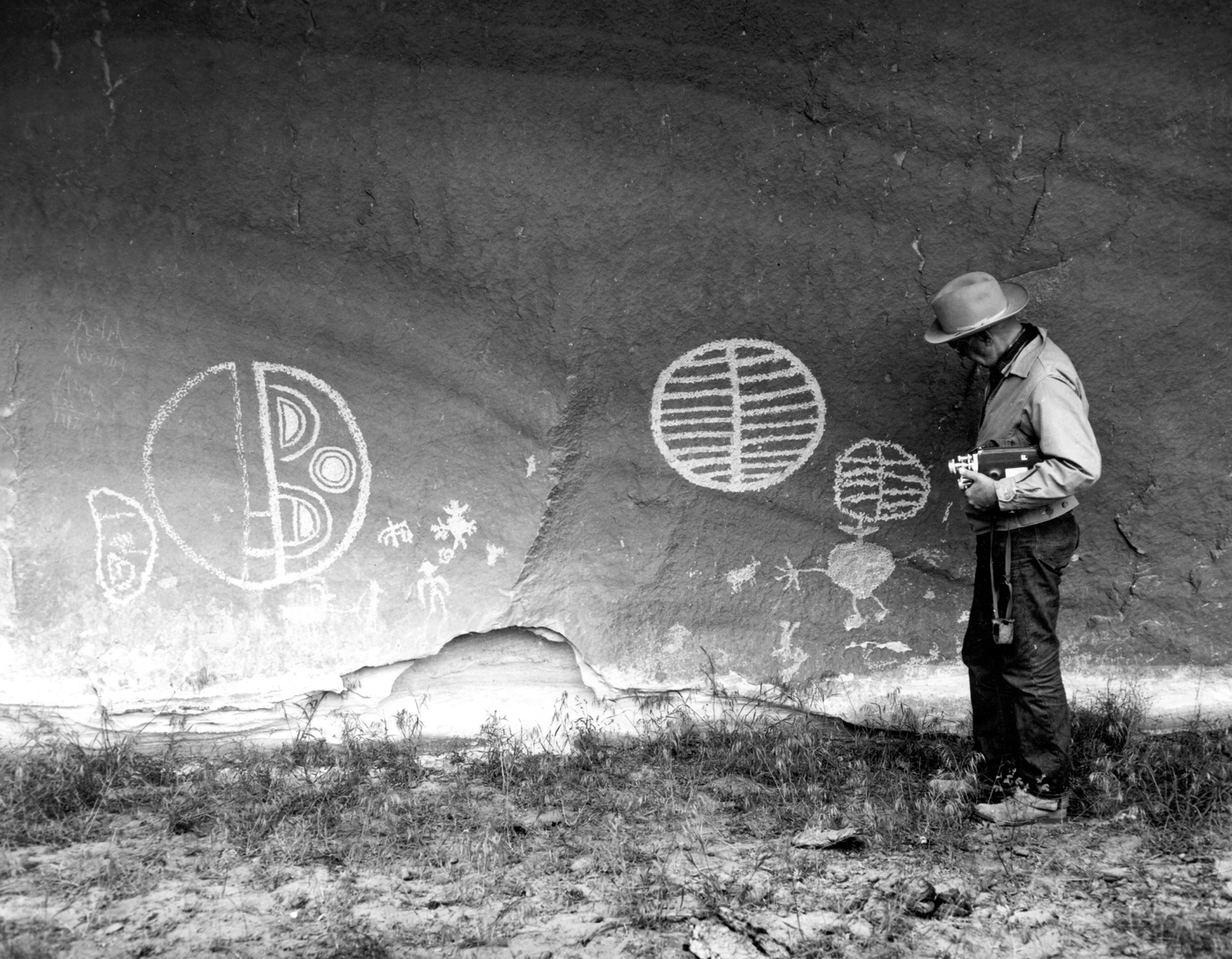
Petroglyphs, Horse Canyon, The Maze. 1962 photo

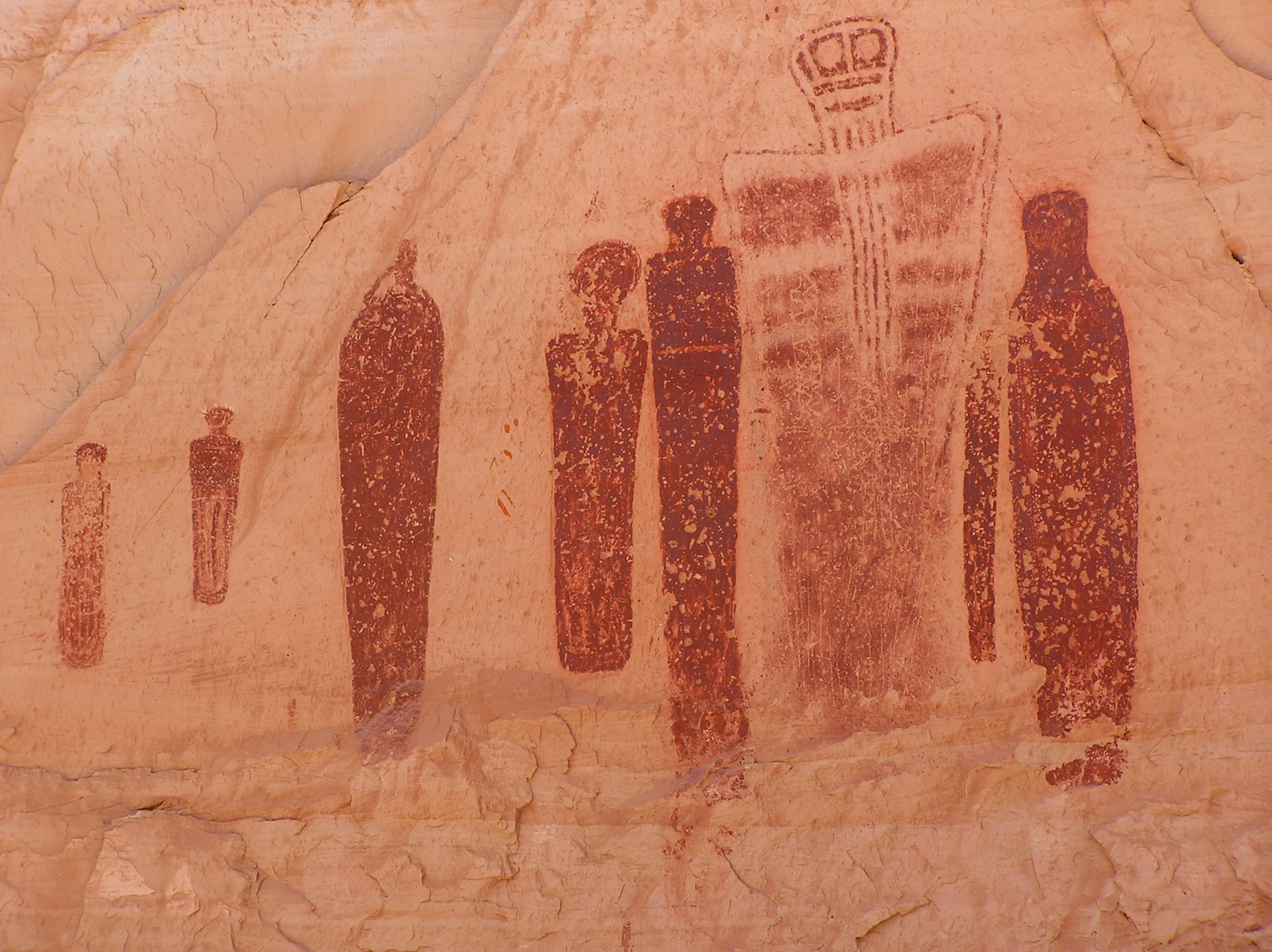
The Great Gallery, Horseshoe Canyon

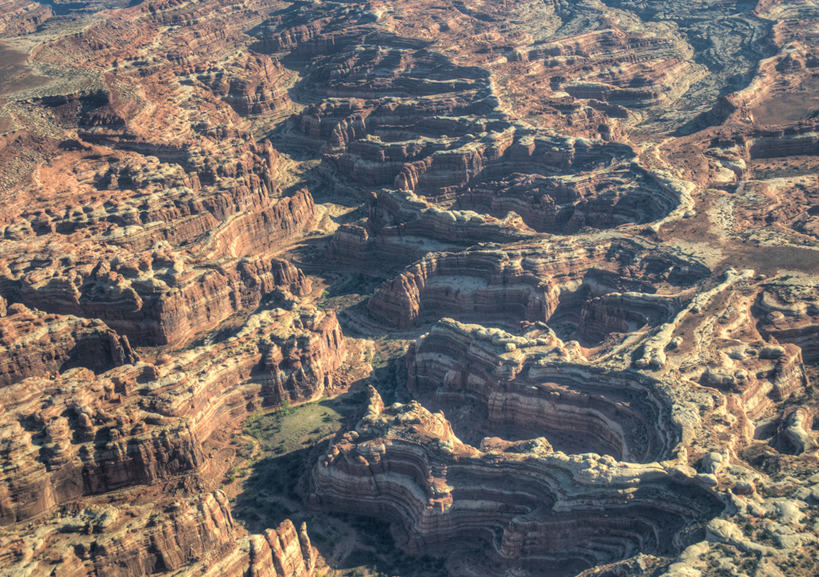
Aerial view of the Maze

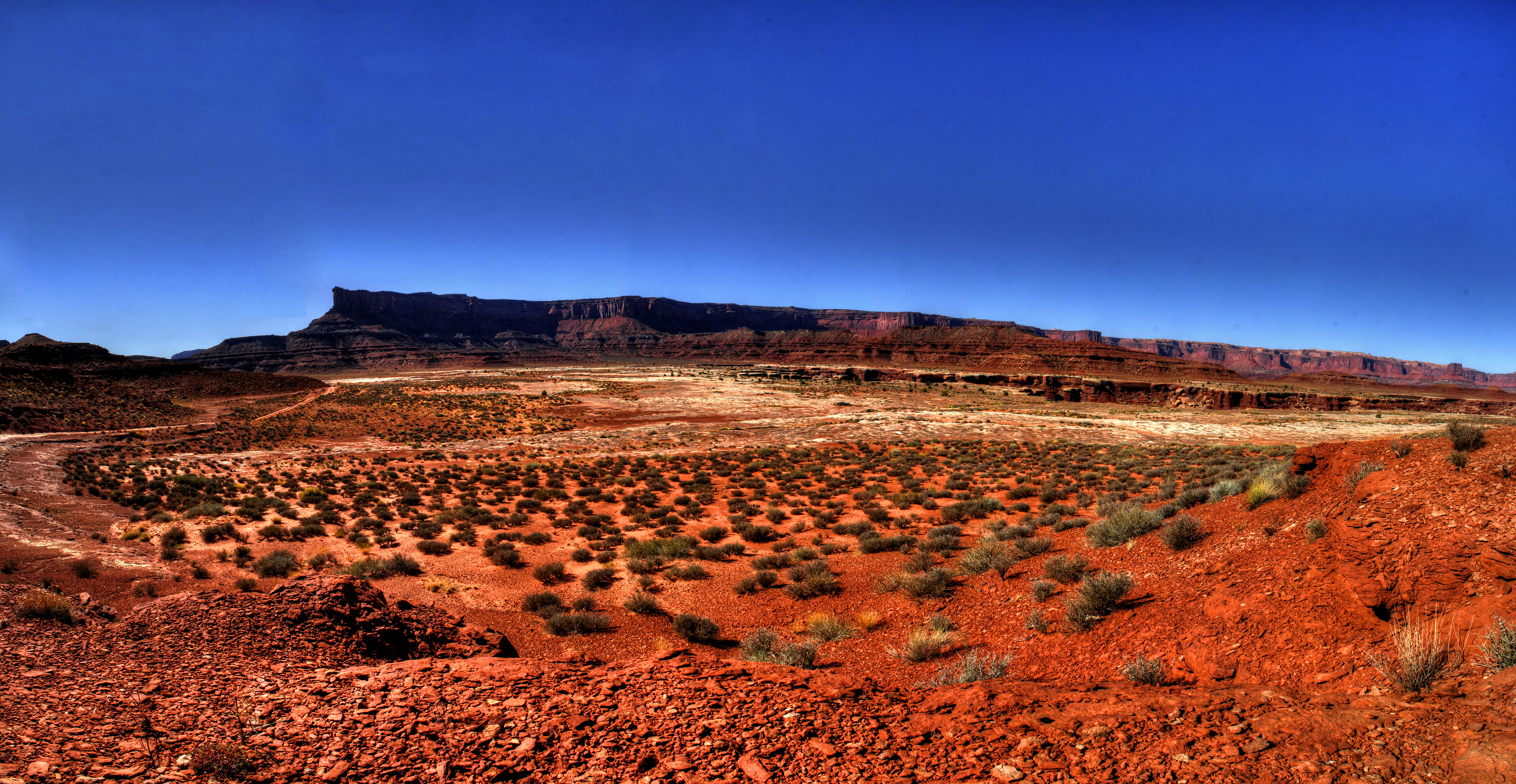
The White Rim in Canyonlands National Park

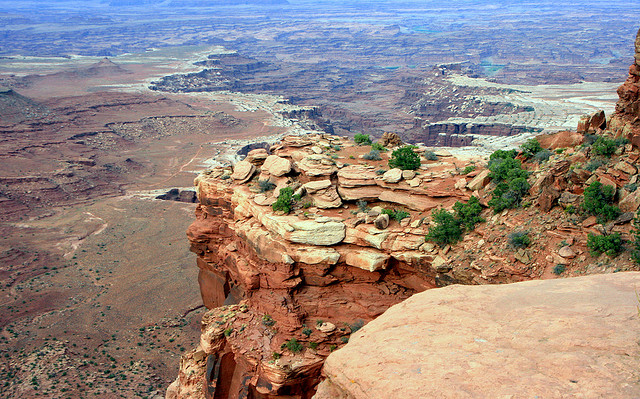
The view from the Island In The Sky overlooking the Colorado River

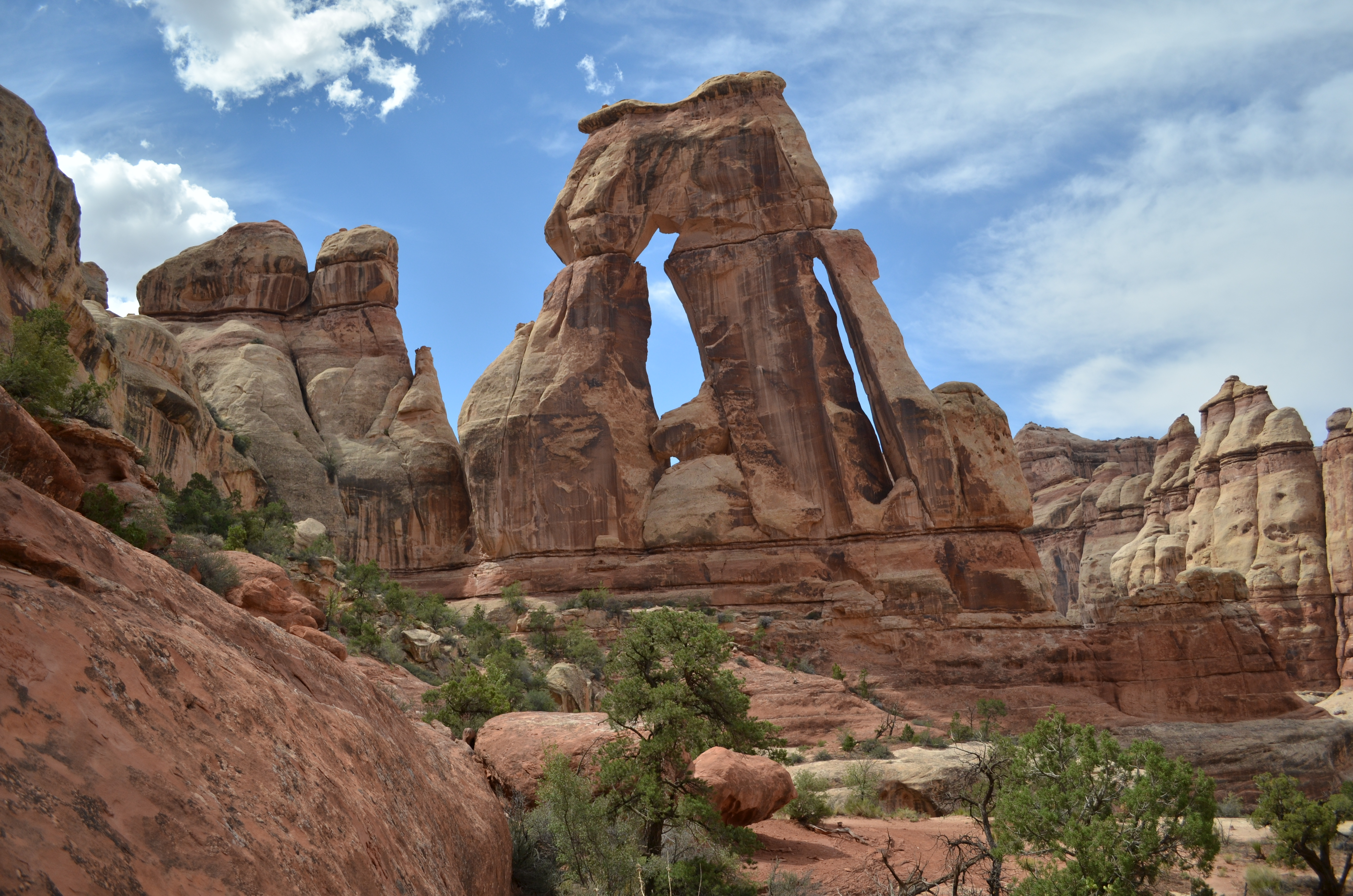
Druid Arch in the Needles district

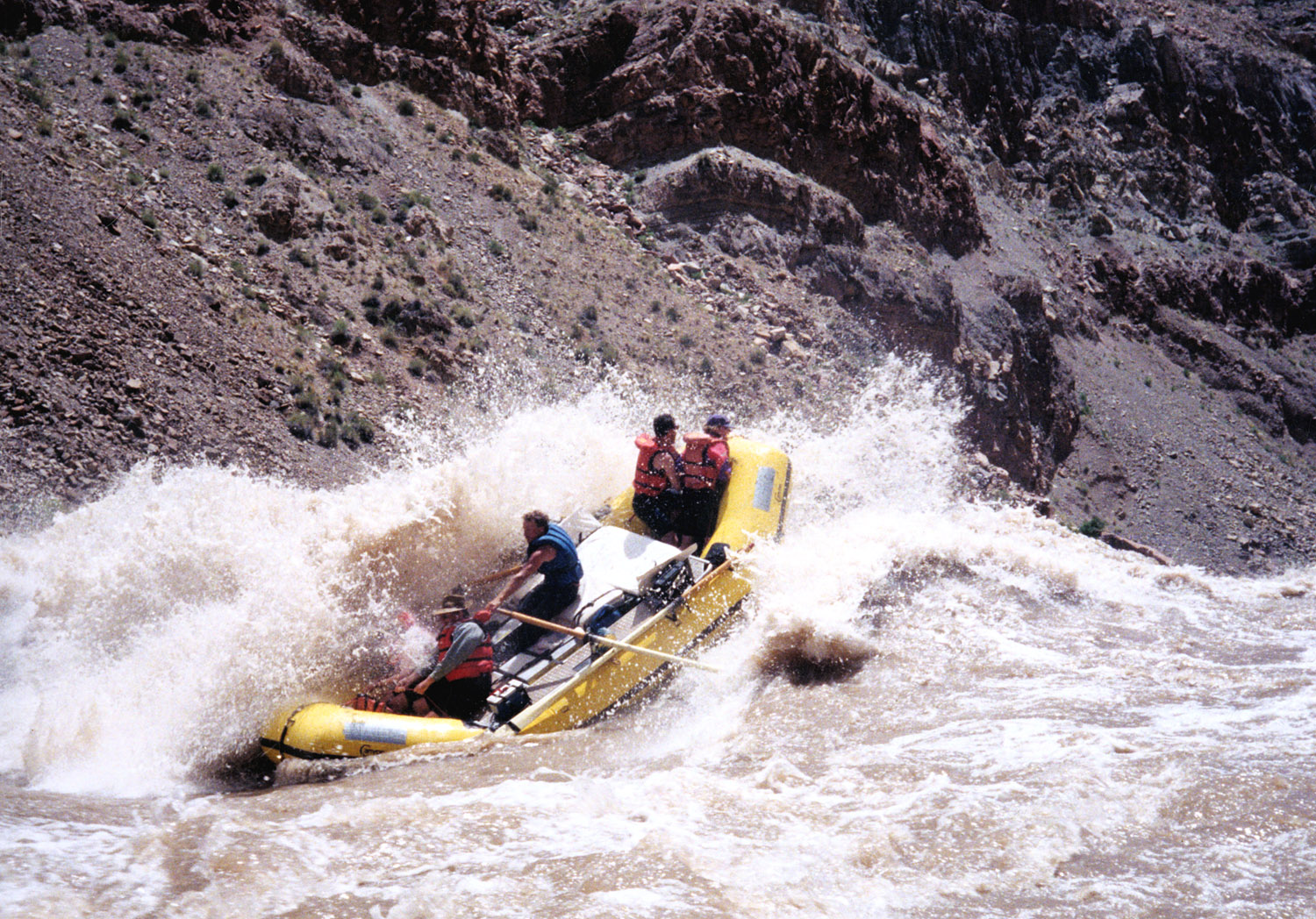
Raft in the Big Drop Rapids, Cataract Canyon

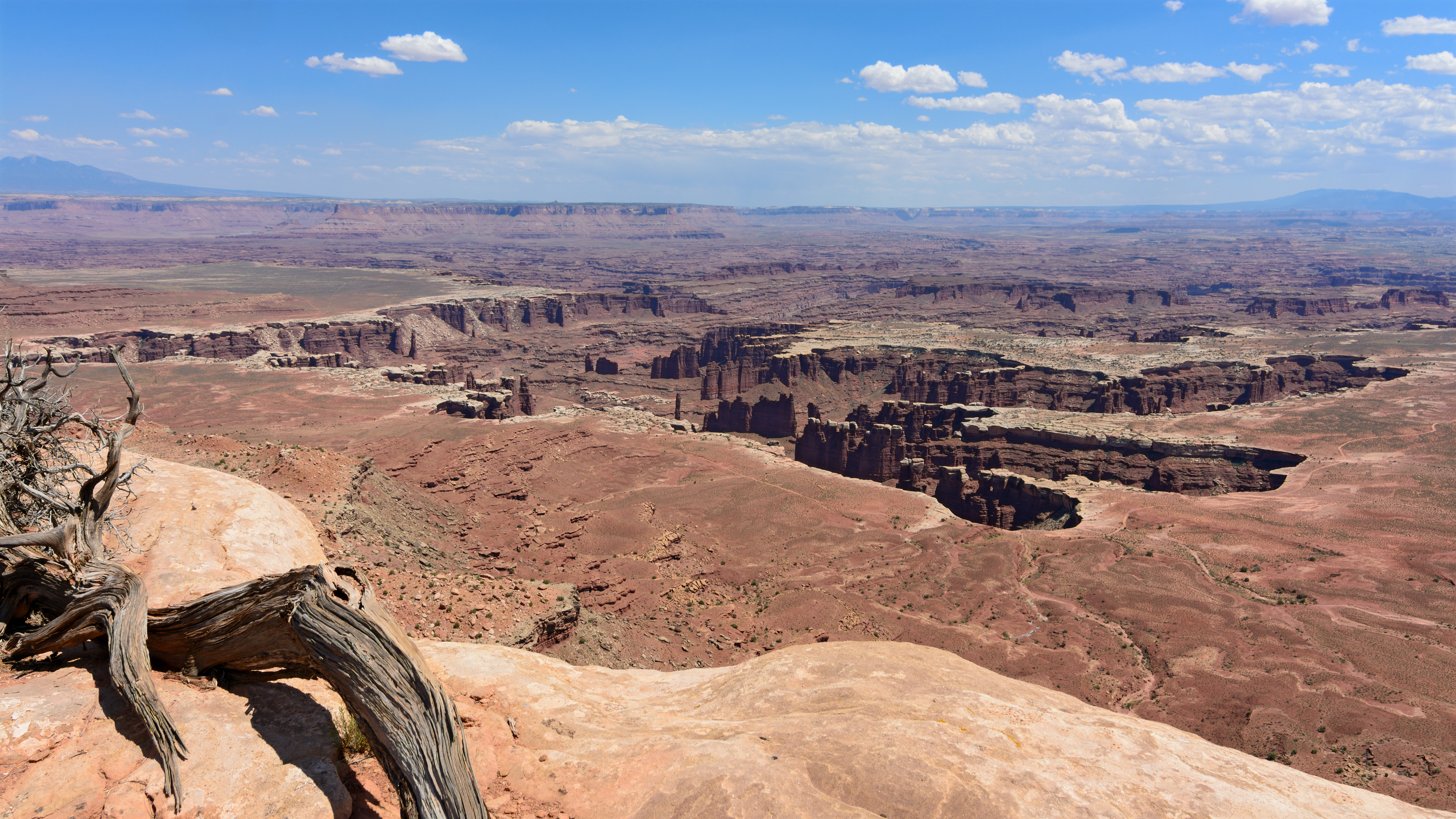
A view from Grand View Point Overlook toward Monument Basin

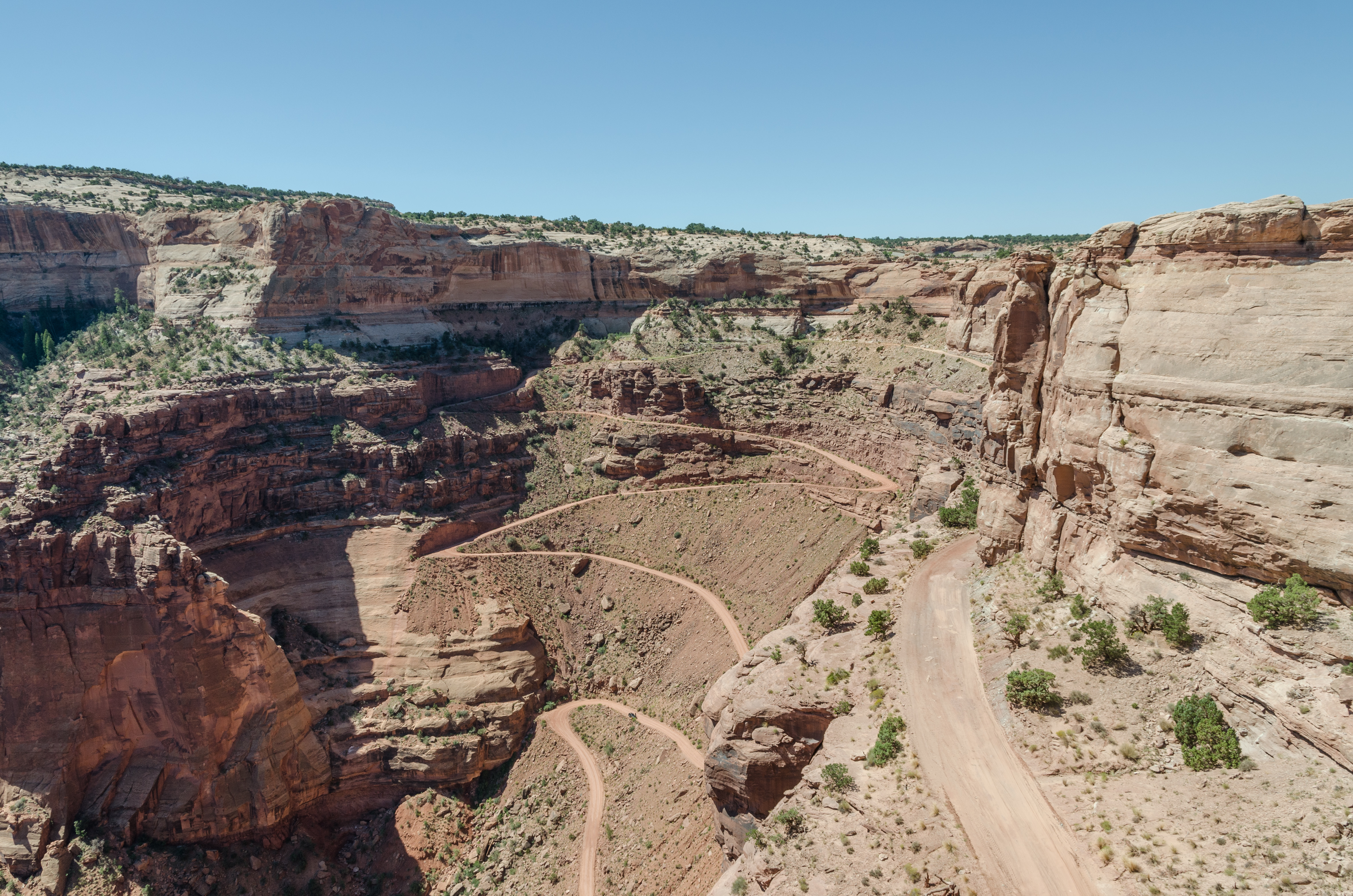
Shafer Canyon and Trail

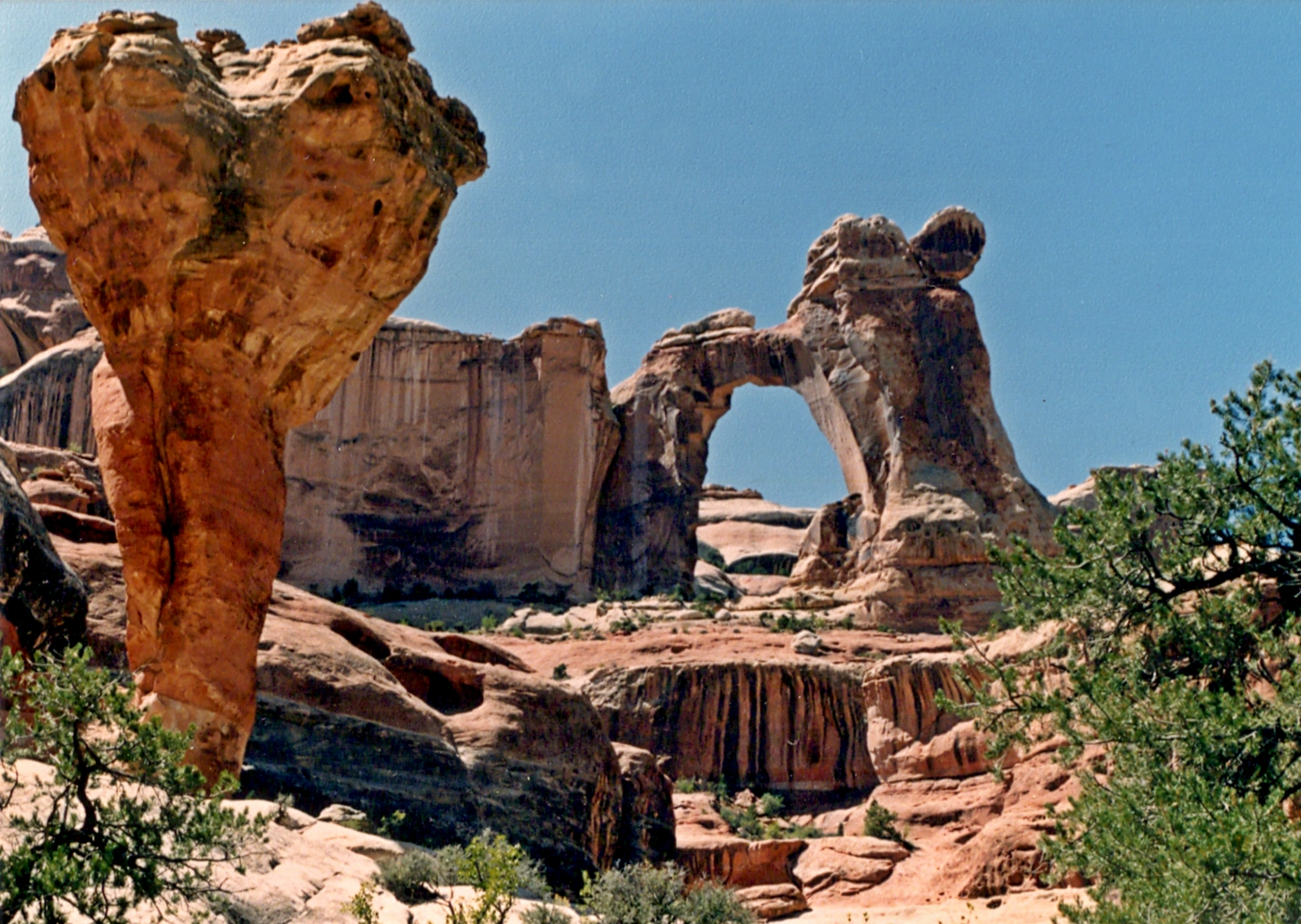
The Molar and Angel Arch
See additional images at Wikimedia

== See also ==
- Bears Ears National Monument
- Goblin Valley State Park
- Indian Creek Wilderness Study Area
- List of national parks of the United States
