= UN (disambiguation) =

UN is the United Nations, an intergovernmental organization with 193 member states.

UN or Un may also refer to:

== Music ==
- UN (band), a Korean musical group
- U.N. (hip hop group), an American hip hop duo
- UN (album), an album by Dan Black
- Un (album), by the anarchist band Chumbawamba

== Places ==
- Un, a village in Lum Choar, Cambodia
- Un, Surat, a town in Gujarat, India
- Un, Uttar Pradesh, a town in India
- United Nations Avenue, a road in the City of Manila, the capital of the Philippines

== Science ==
- Uranium mononitride, part of the uranium nitride family of compounds
- UN number, a four-digit number that identifies a hazardous substance

== Other uses ==
- Lance Rivera, known as Lance "Un" Rivera, American film producer
- Transaero (former IATA code:UN)
- National Exam (Indonesia) (Ujian Nasional)
- Union Nationale, any one of several political parties
- An abbreviation for Undo
- United Network, a defunct TV network

== See also ==
- United Nations (disambiguation)
- Unn (disambiguation)
