= Tiki Tower =

Sandstone pinnacle in San Juan County, Utah

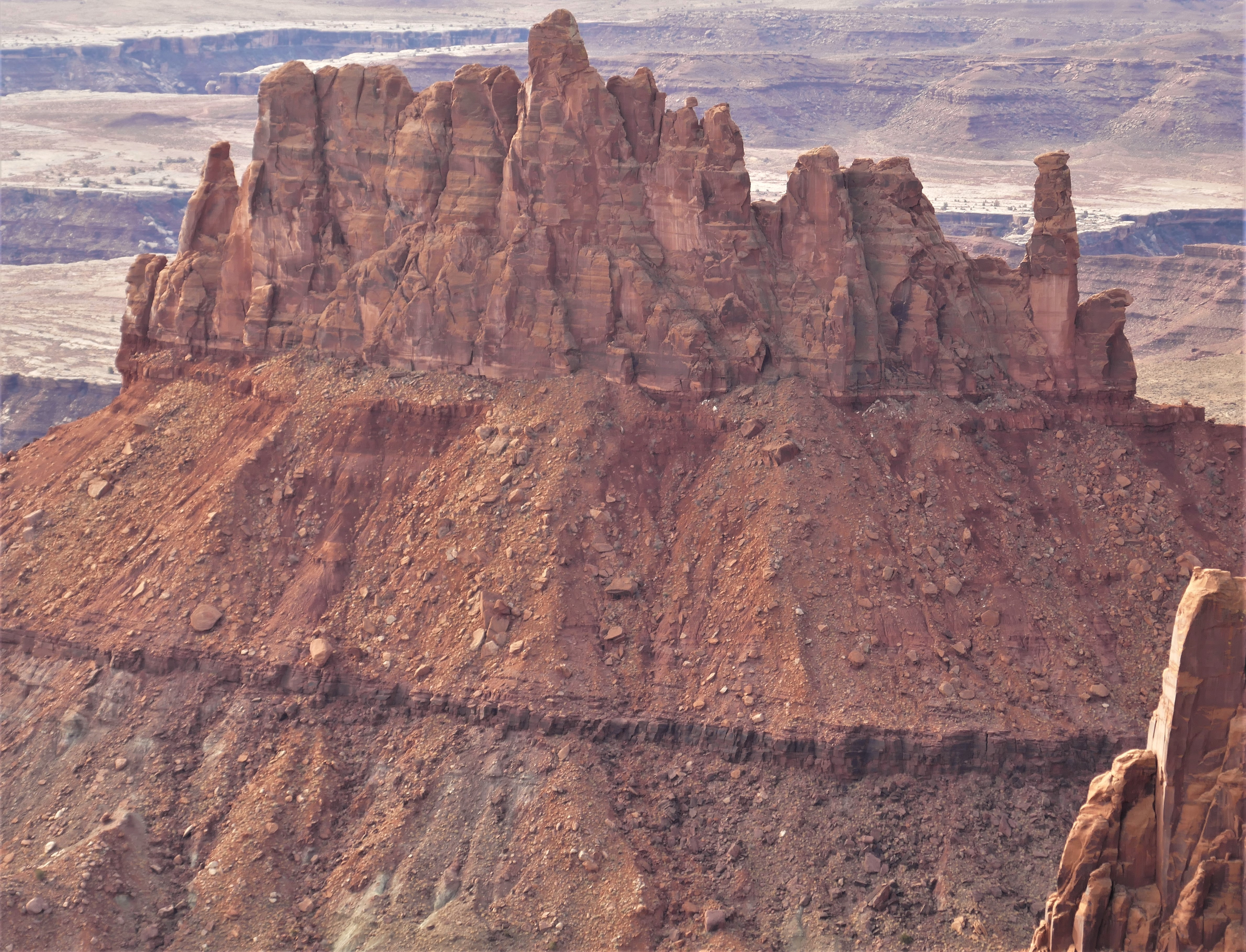
- Tiki Tower to right, north aspect

Highest point
- Elevation: 5,500 ft (1,700 m)
- Prominence: 160 ft (49 m)
- Parent peak: Point 5601
- Isolation: 0.09 mi (0.14 km)
- Coordinates: 38°23′54″N 109°48′54″W

Geography
- Location within Utah Location within the United States
- Country: United States
- State: Utah
- County: San Juan
- Protected area: Canyonlands National Park
- Parent range: Colorado Plateau
- Topo map: USGS Musselman Arch

Geology
- Rock age: Late Triassic
- Rock type: Wingate Sandstone

Climbing
- First ascent: 1991
- Easiest route: class 5.9 A1 Climbing

Tiki Tower is a thin 300-foot (91-meter) tall sandstone pinnacle located in the Airport Tower/Monster Tower/Washer Woman area of the Island in the Sky District of Canyonlands National Park, in San Juan County, Utah. It is situated one-half mile northwest of Airport Tower, and is composed of Wingate Sandstone, which is the remains of wind-borne sand dunes deposited approximately 200 million years ago in the Late Triassic. Access to this tower is via the four-wheel-drive White Rim Road. The top of this spire rises 1,100 feet above the road in a little more than one mile. Precipitation runoff from Tiki Tower drains southeast into the nearby Colorado River via Buck and Lathrop Canyons. The first ascent of Tiki Tower was made in November 1991 by Jeff Widen and Mitch Allen, via Brave Little Toaster (5.11, 3 pitches), with Fred Lifton and Paul Frank working the first pitch.

== Climate ==
Spring and fall are the most favorable seasons to visit Tiki Tower. According to the Köppen climate classification system, it is located in a Cold semi-arid climate zone, which is defined by the coldest month having an average mean temperature below 0 °C (32 °F) and at least 50% of the total annual precipitation being received during the spring and summer. This desert climate receives less than 10 inches (250 millimeters) of annual rainfall, and snowfall is generally light during the winter.

== See also ==
- Colorado Plateau
- Geology of the Canyonlands area
