= Chip and Dale Towers =

Sandstone towers in Canyonlands National Park, Utah, USA

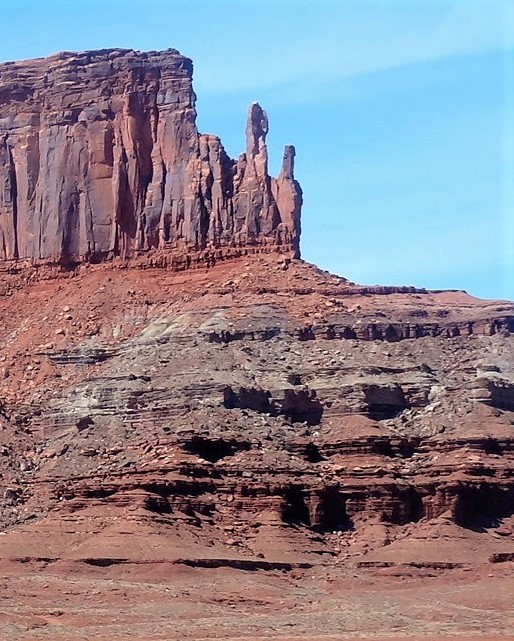
- Chip and Dale Towers, east aspect

Highest point
- Elevation: 5,620 ft (1,710 m)
- Prominence: 120 ft (37 m)
- Isolation: 0.83 mi (1.34 km)
- Coordinates: 38°24′59″N 109°46′40″W

Geography
- Location within Utah Location within the United States
- Country: United States
- State: Utah
- County: San Juan
- Protected area: Canyonlands National Park
- Parent range: Colorado Plateau
- Topo map: USGS Musselman Arch

Geology
- Rock age: Late Triassic
- Rock type: Wingate Sandstone

Climbing
- First ascent: 1993, 1994
- Easiest route: class 5.9 climbing

Chip and Dale Towers are two 300-foot (91-meter) tall sandstone towers located in the Island in the Sky District of Canyonlands National Park, in San Juan County, Utah. Dale Tower rises to an elevation of 5,620 feet (1,710 meters), whereas the lower Chip Tower is 5,420-feet. Airport Tower is set 2.5 mi (4.0 km) to the southwest, and Dead Horse Point State Park overlook is situated 4.5 mi (7.2 km) to the north-northeast. Chip and Dale Towers are an eroded fin composed of hard, fine-grained Wingate Sandstone, which is the remains of wind-borne sand dunes deposited approximately 200 million years ago in the Late Triassic. This Wingate Sandstone overlays a softer layer of the Chinle Formation. Access to the towers is via the four-wheel drive White Rim Road, and a scramble to reach the base. The top of the towers rise over 1,000 feet above the road in approximately one-half mile. Precipitation runoff from Chip and Dale Towers drains east to the nearby Colorado River.

== Climbing ==
The first ascent of 240-foot Chip Tower was made in October 1993 by Jeff Widen and Jeff Singer via Stuffin Nuts, (III, class 5.9, A2) on the south face. The first ascent of 330-foot Dale Tower was made October 2, 1994, by Jeff Widen, Cameron Burns, and Jeff Singer, via Boy's Night Out, (III, 5.9, Al, 3 pitches). The National Park Service temporarily closes access to these climbing routes to protect wildlife habitat for lambing desert bighorn sheep and nesting raptors season (March through August).

== Climate ==
According to the Köppen climate classification system, the towers are located in a Cold semi-arid climate zone, which is defined by the coldest month having an average mean temperature below −0 °C (32 °F) and at least 50% of the total annual precipitation being received during the spring and summer. This desert climate receives less than 10 inches (250 millimeters) of annual rainfall, and snowfall is generally light during the winter.

== See also ==
- Colorado Plateau
- Geology of the Canyonlands area

== Gallery ==
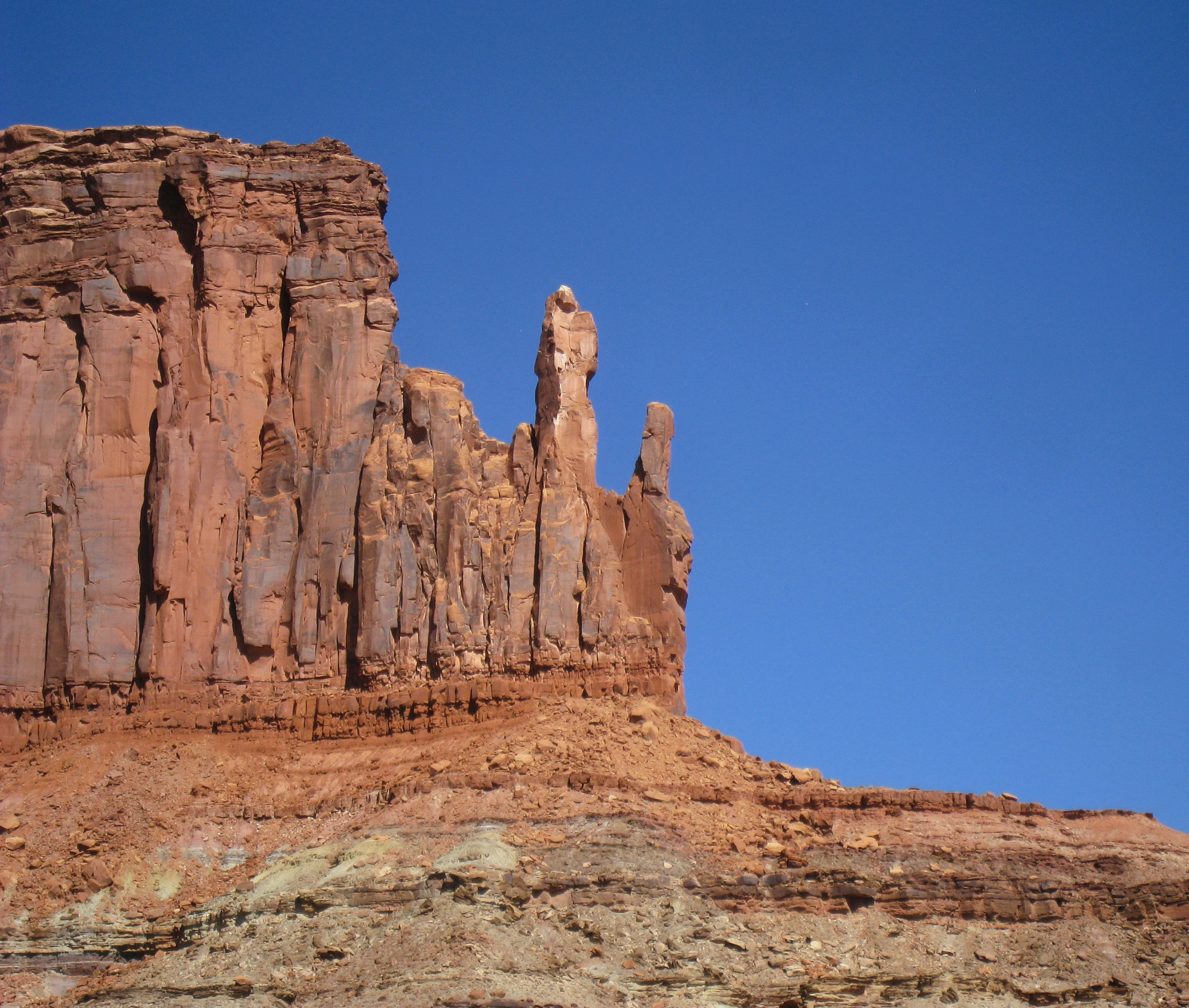
Dale Tower centered, and Chip Tower to right, from the east.

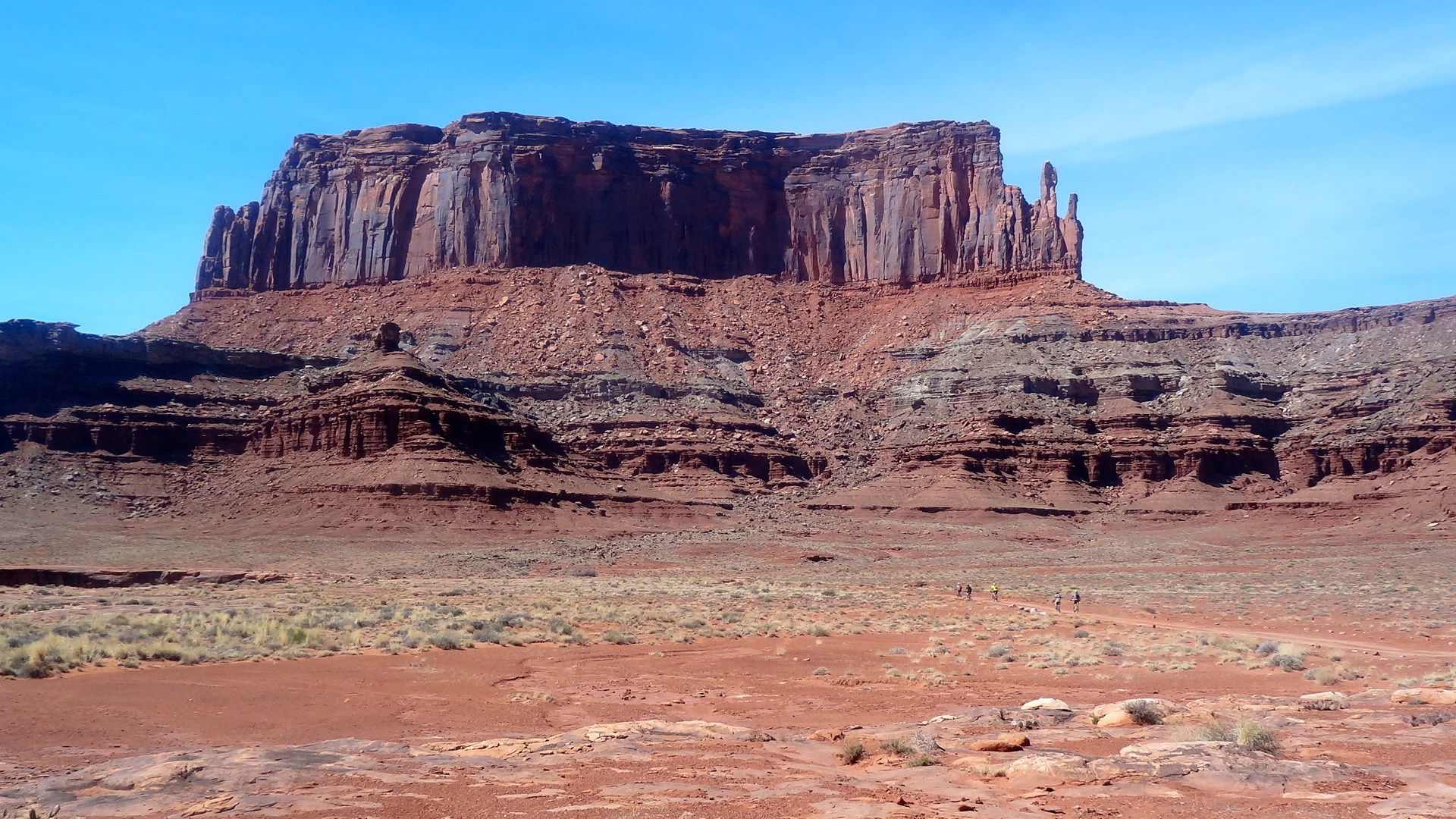
Point 5931 with Chip and Dale Towers to right
