= Washer Woman =

Sandstone arch and tower in Utah, US

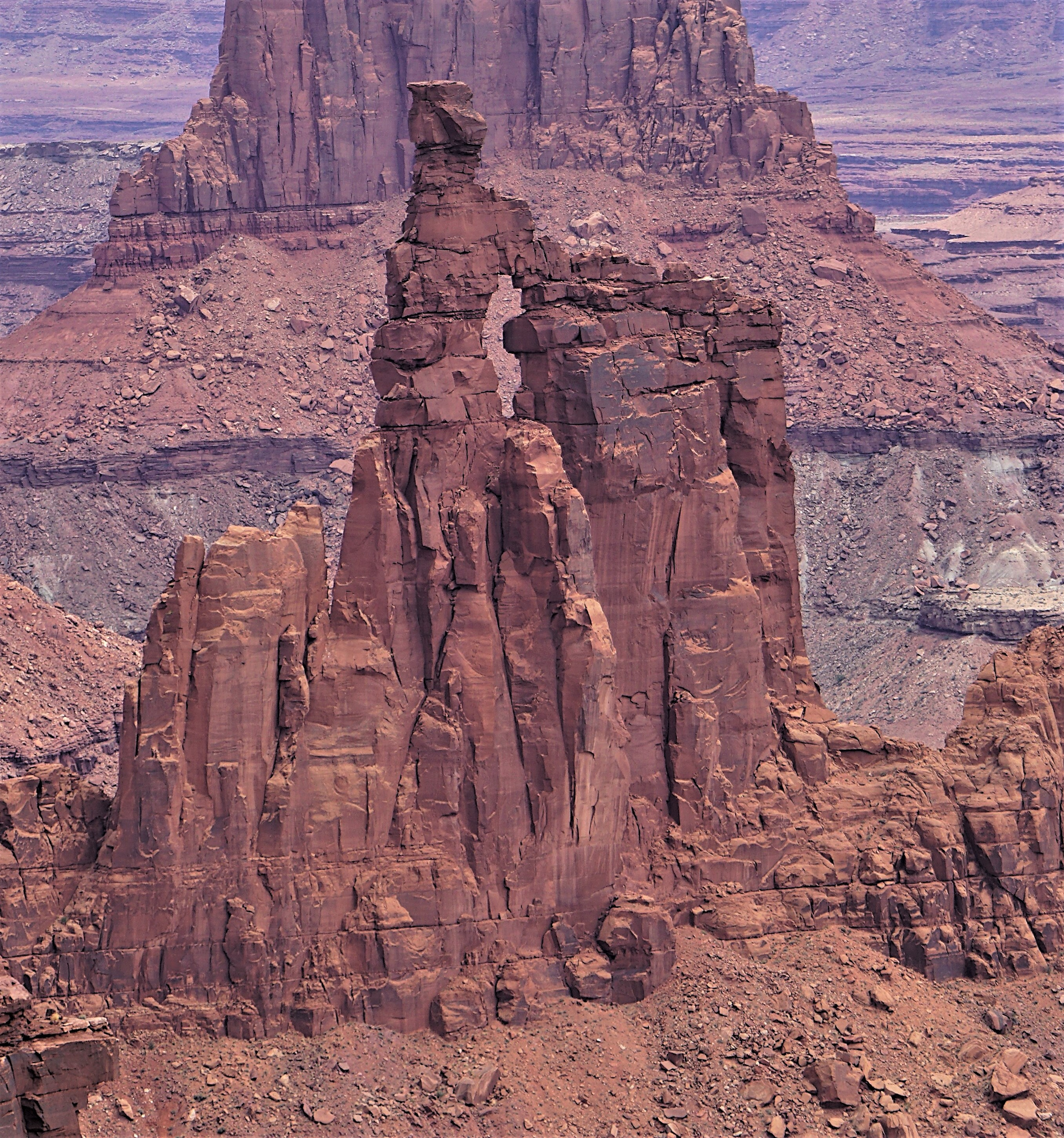
- Washer Woman, west aspect

Highest point
- Elevation: 5,819 ft (1,774 m)
- Prominence: 339 ft (103 m)
- Parent peak: Monster Tower (5,880 ft)
- Isolation: 0.05 mi (0.080 km)
- Coordinates: 38°23′25″N 109°50′17″W

Geography
- Location within Utah Location within the United States
- Country: United States
- State: Utah
- County: San Juan
- Protected area: Canyonlands National Park
- Parent range: Colorado Plateau
- Topo map: USGS Musselman Arch

Geology
- Rock age: Late Triassic
- Rock type: Wingate Sandstone

Climbing
- First ascent: 1967
- Easiest route: class 5.10+ In Search of Suds

Washer Woman is a 500-foot-tall (150-meter) sandstone arch and tower located in the Island in the Sky District of Canyonlands National Park, in San Juan County, Utah. It is situated 300 feet northwest of the slightly higher Monster Tower. Washer Woman is so named because the feature gives the appearance of a washerwoman bent over a washtub. This geographical feature's name was officially adopted in 1986 by the U.S. Board on Geographic Names after previously having similar names such as Washer-Woman Arch and The Washer Woman. Washer Woman and Monster Tower are an eroded fin composed of Wingate Sandstone, which is the remains of wind-borne sand dunes deposited approximately 200 million years ago in the Late Triassic. Airport Tower is set 1.6 mi (2.6 km) to the east, and Mesa Arch is situated 1.5 mi (2.4 km) to the west. A short hike to Mesa Arch provides the easiest view of Washer Woman. Access to this formation is via the four-wheel drive White Rim Road, which is the other option to see it. The top of this geological formation rises 1,300 feet above the road in approximately one mile. Precipitation runoff from Washer Woman drains southeast into the nearby Colorado River via Buck Canyon.

== Climbing ==
The first ascent of Washer Woman was made by Maurice Horn, John Horn, and Pete Carmen on Apr 20, 1967, via the South Face. The first ascent of the classic In Search of Suds route on the West Face was made by Glenn Randall and Charlie Fowler in September 1982.

== Climate ==
Spring and fall are the most favorable seasons to visit Washer Woman. According to the Köppen climate classification system, it is located in a Cold semi-arid climate zone, which is defined by the coldest month having an average mean temperature below −0 °C (32 °F) and at least 50% of the total annual precipitation being received during the spring and summer. This desert climate receives less than 10 inches (250 millimeters) of annual rainfall, and snowfall is generally light during the winter.

== Gallery ==
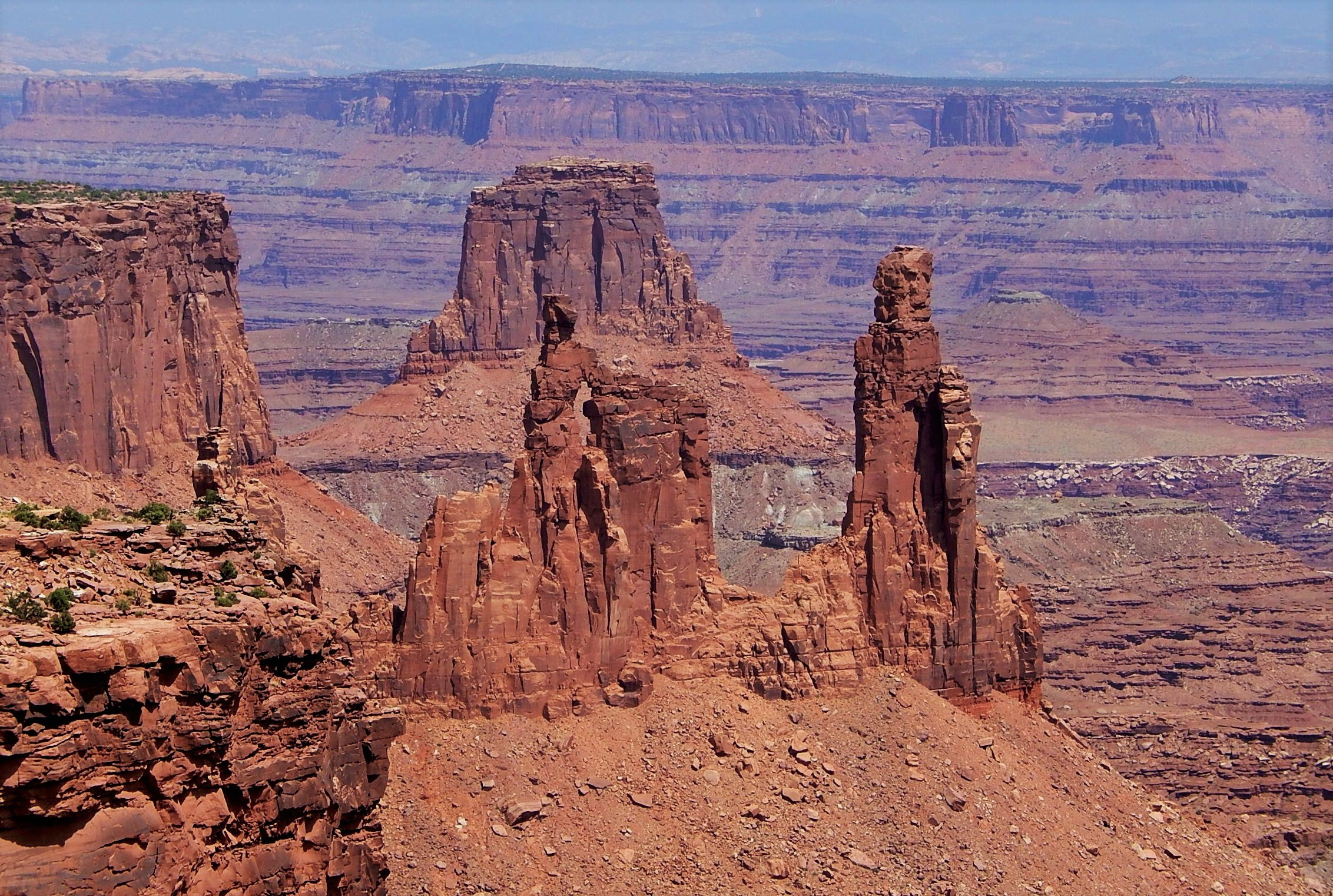
Washer Woman, Monster Tower, and Airport Tower seen from west.
United Nations Tablet on skyline

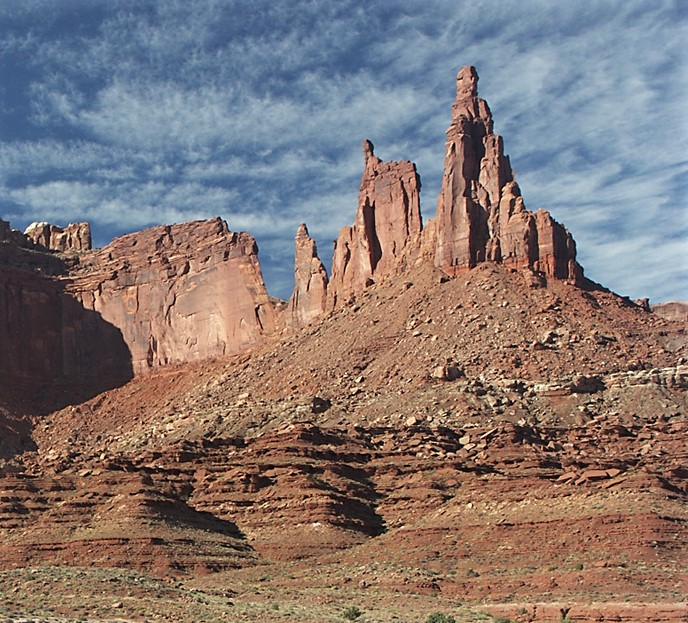
Washer Woman and Monster Tower

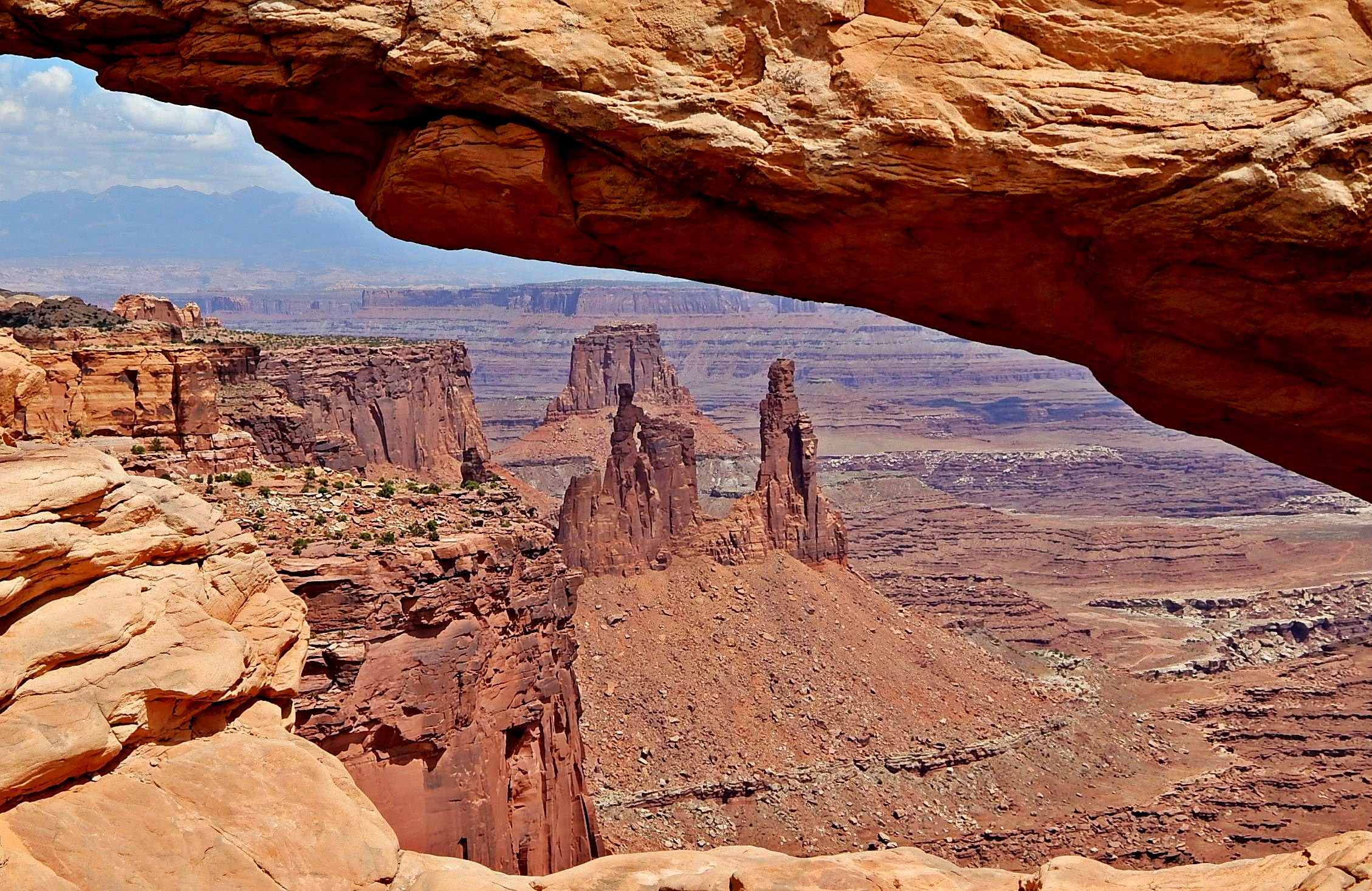
Washer Woman from Mesa Arch

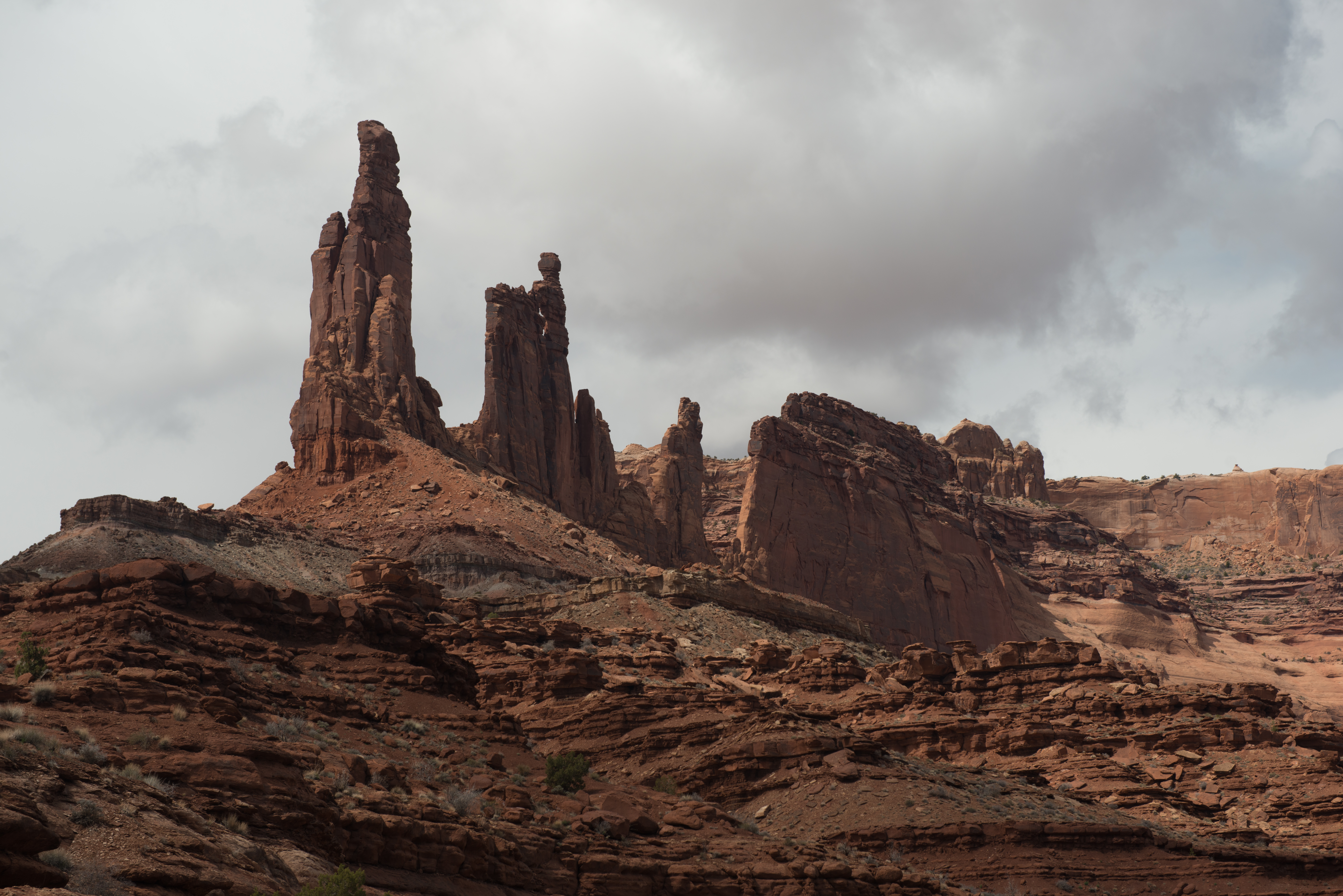
Monster and Washer Woman from ESE at Buck Canyon

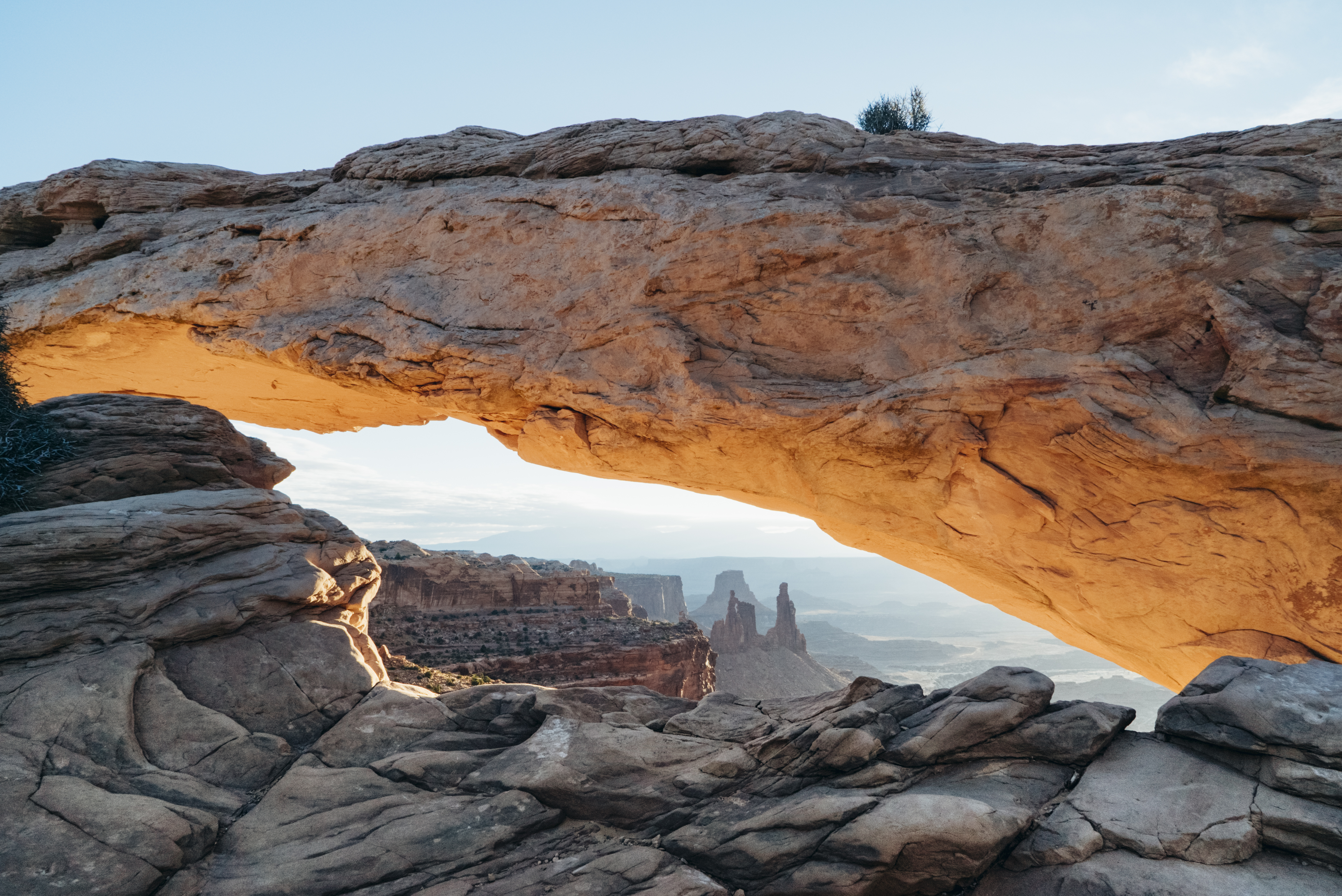
Washer Woman framed by Mesa Arch

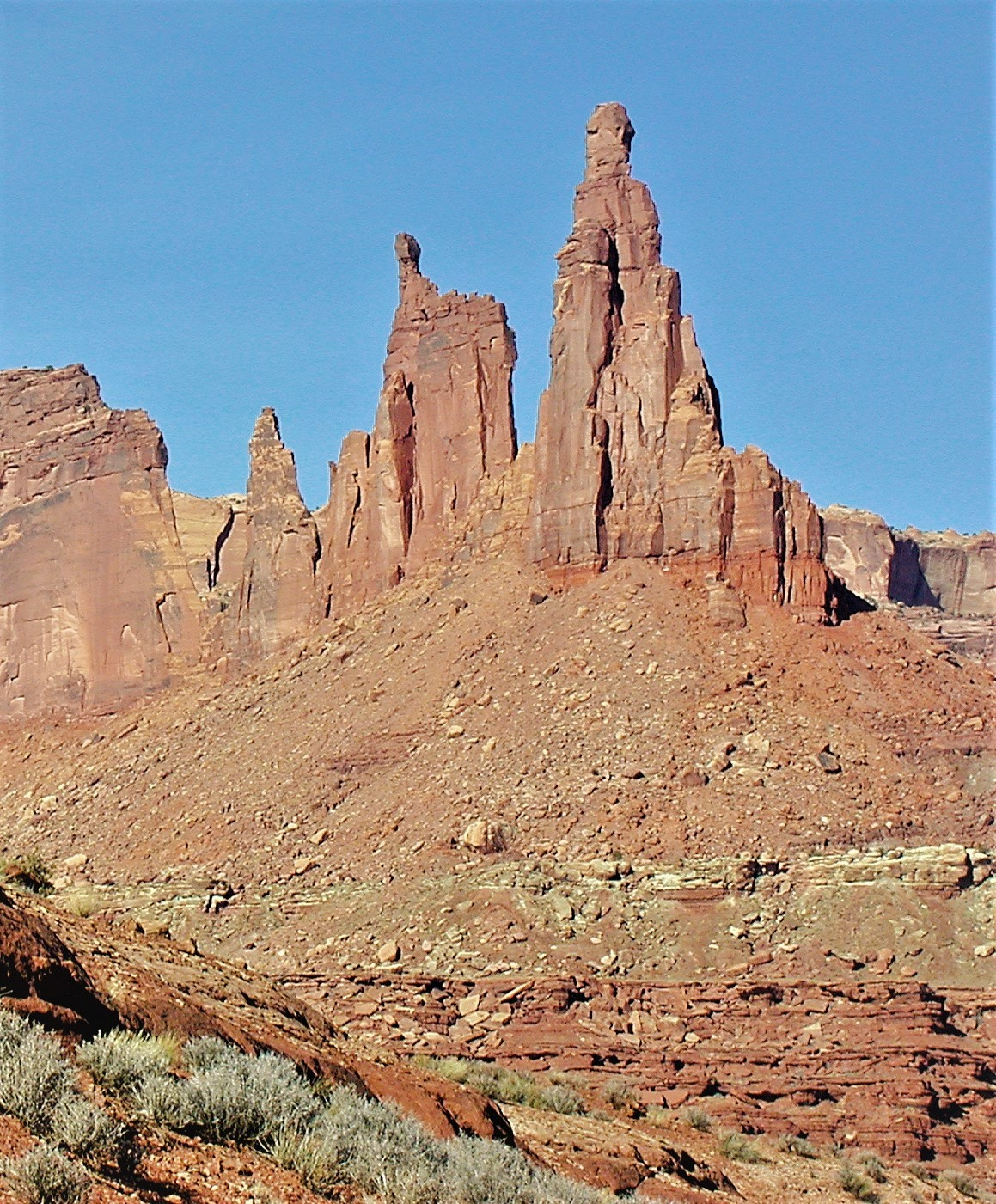
Washer Woman centered

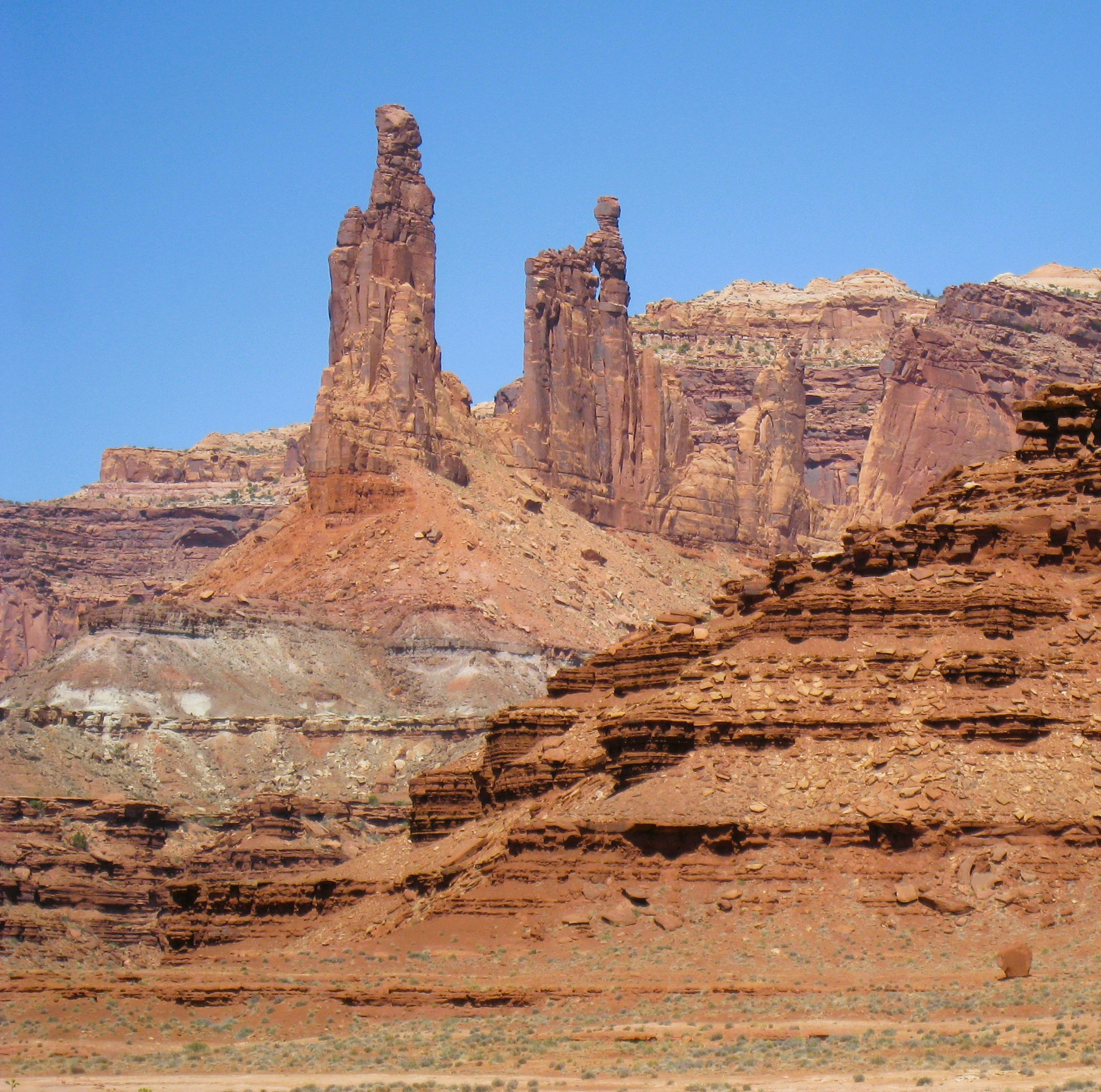
Monster Tower (left) and Washer Woman

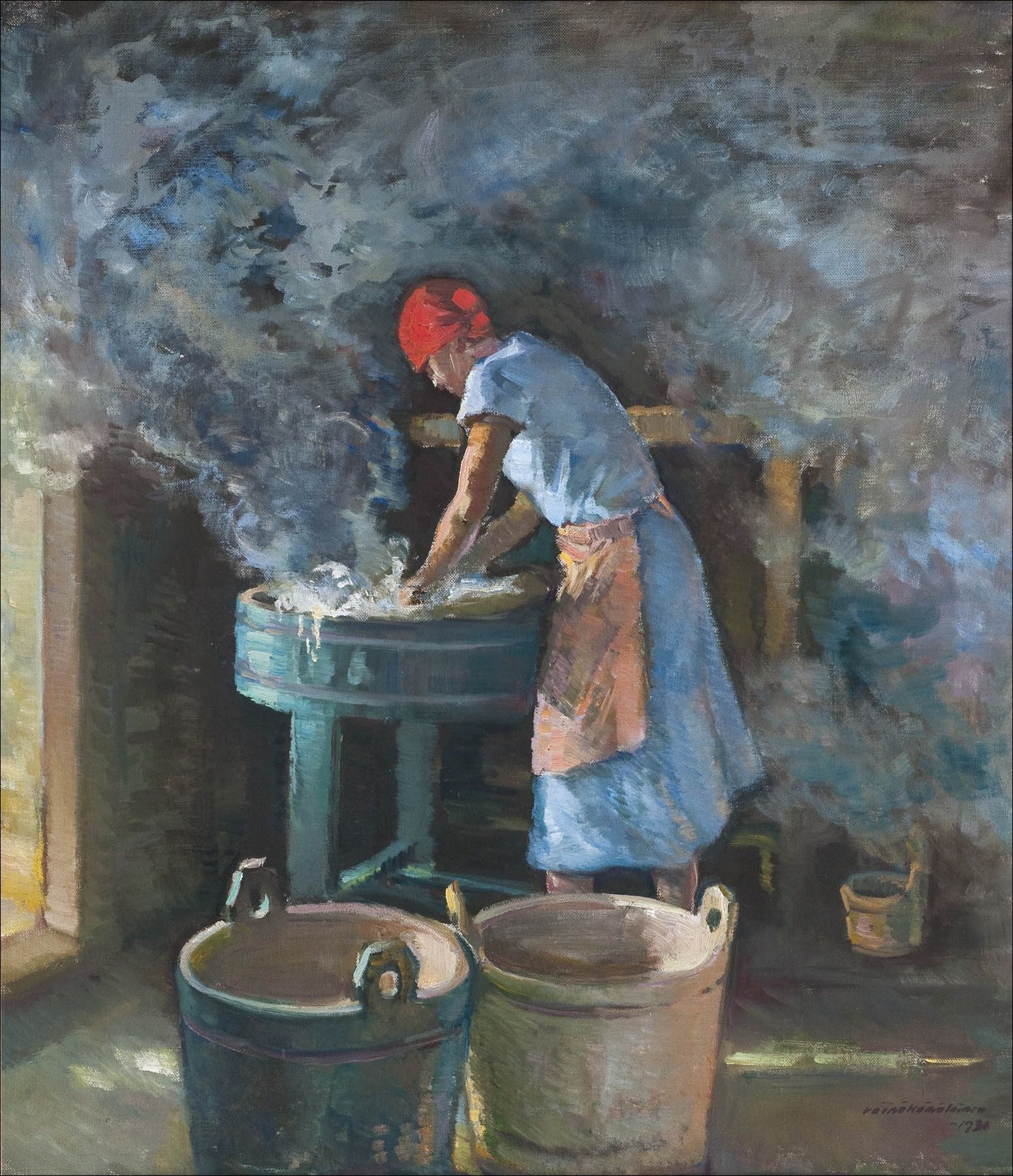
Painting of a Washer Woman

== See also ==
- Colorado Plateau
- Geology of the Canyonlands area
