= Airport Tower (Canyonlands) =

Sandstone butte in San Juan County, Utah

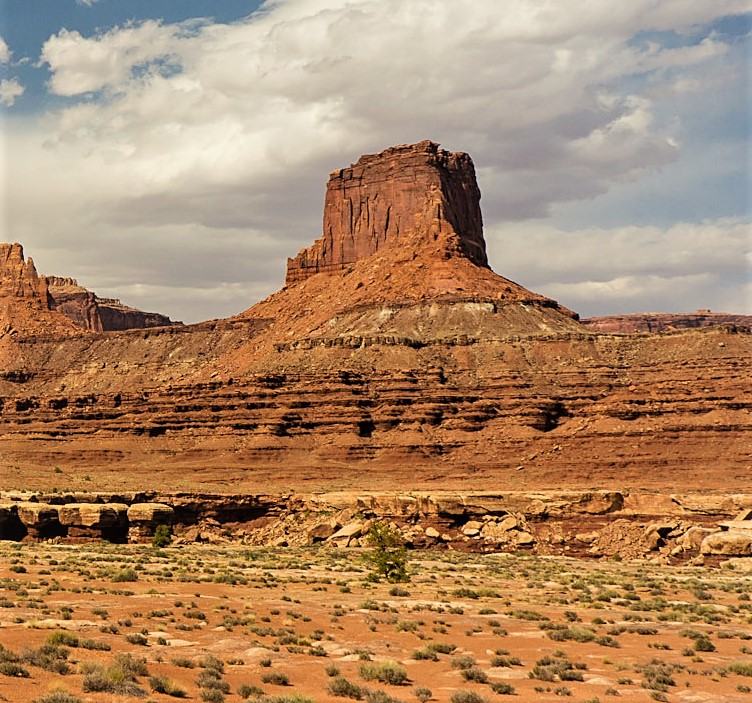
- Southwest aspect from White Rim Road

Highest point
- Elevation: 5,812 ft (1,771 m)
- Prominence: 732 ft (223 m)
- Parent peak: Monster Tower (5,880 ft)
- Isolation: 1.61 mi (2.59 km)
- Coordinates: 38°23′35″N 109°48′29″W

Geography
- Location within Utah Location within the United States
- Country: United States
- State: Utah
- County: San Juan
- Protected area: Canyonlands National Park
- Parent range: Colorado Plateau
- Topo map: USGS Musselman Arch

Geology
- Rock age: Late Triassic
- Rock type: Wingate Sandstone

Climbing
- Easiest route: class 5.10 A3 Climbing

Airport Tower is a 700-foot-tall (210-meter) sandstone butte located in the Island in the Sky District of Canyonlands National Park, in San Juan County, Utah. It is situated 1.64 mile east of Washer Woman, which is a towering arch similar in height. Each are composed of Wingate Sandstone, which is the remains of wind-borne sand dunes deposited approximately 200 million years ago in the Late Triassic. The nearest higher neighbor is Monster Tower, 1.6 mi (2.6 km) to the west, Tiki Tower is one-half mile northwest, and Mesa Arch is situated 3.2 mi (5.1 km) to the west. A short hike to Mesa Arch provides the easiest view of Airport Tower. Access to this tower is via the four-wheel drive White Rim Road, which is another option to see Airport Tower. The top of this geological formation rises 1,400 feet above the road in less than one mile. Precipitation runoff from Airport Tower drains southeast into the nearby Colorado River via Buck and Lathrop Canyons. This geographical feature's name was officially adopted in 1986 by the U.S. Board on Geographic Names. It was so named because the rock formation resembles the appearance of an airport control tower.

== Climbing ==
The first ascent of Airport Tower was made in July 1994 by Galen Howell, Sonja Paspal, and Steve Swanke, via Wind Shear (5.11, A1, 5 pitches).

The second ascent was made in September 1995 by Mike Baker and Leslie Henderson via Sky Pilot (IV 5.9 A3).

The first free ascent of Airport Tower was made in 1998 by Bret Ruckman and Marco Corncchione via Wind Shear (class 5.12a/b), calling it a five-star route.

== Climate ==
Spring and fall are the most favorable seasons to visit Airport Tower. According to the Köppen climate classification system, it is located in a Cold semi-arid climate zone, which is defined by the coldest month having an average mean temperature below −0 °C (32 °F) and at least 50% of the total annual precipitation being received during the spring and summer. This desert climate receives less than 10 inches (250 millimeters) of annual rainfall, and snowfall is generally light during the winter.

== Gallery ==
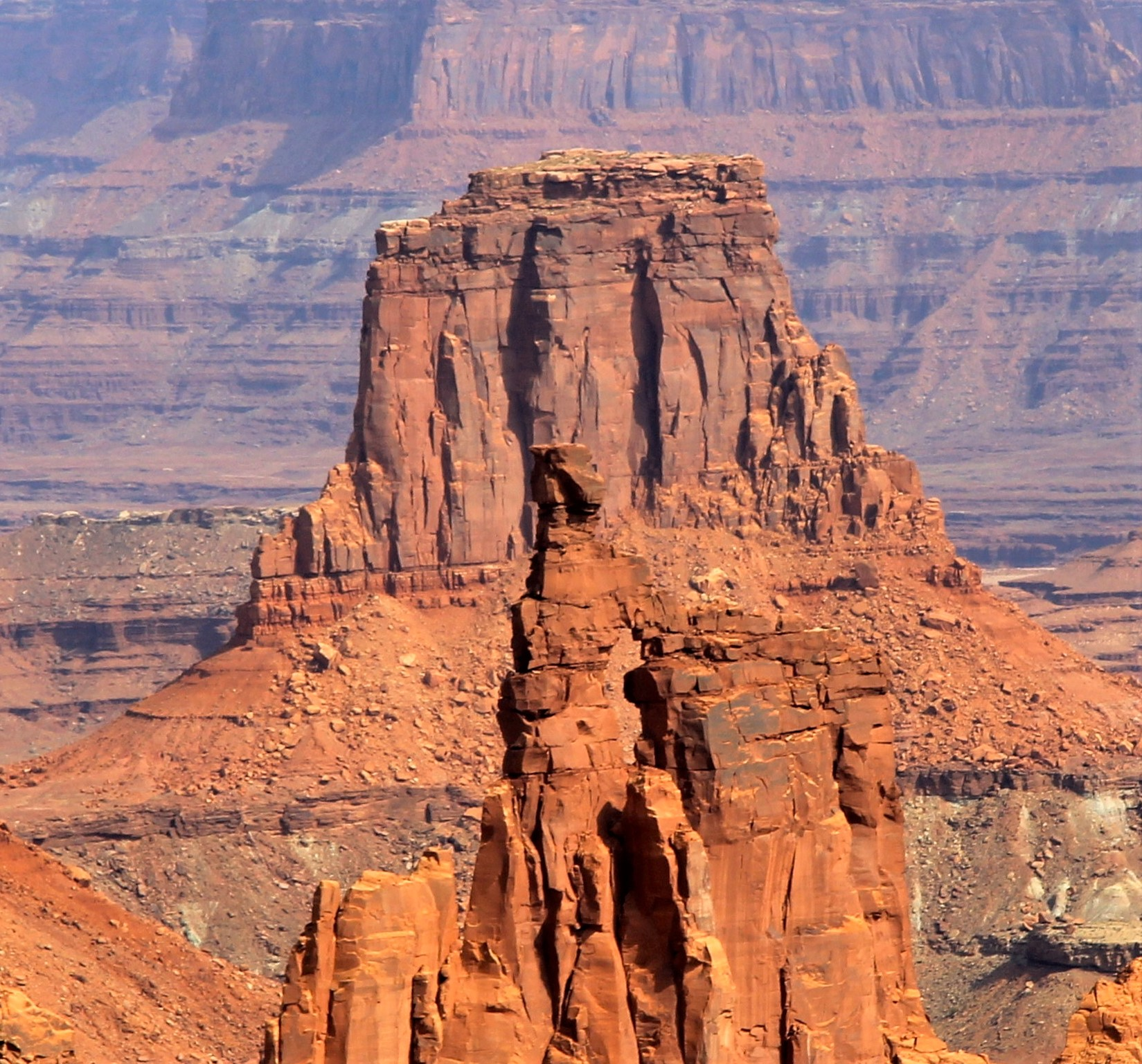
Washer Woman and Airport Tower seen from the west at Mesa Arch

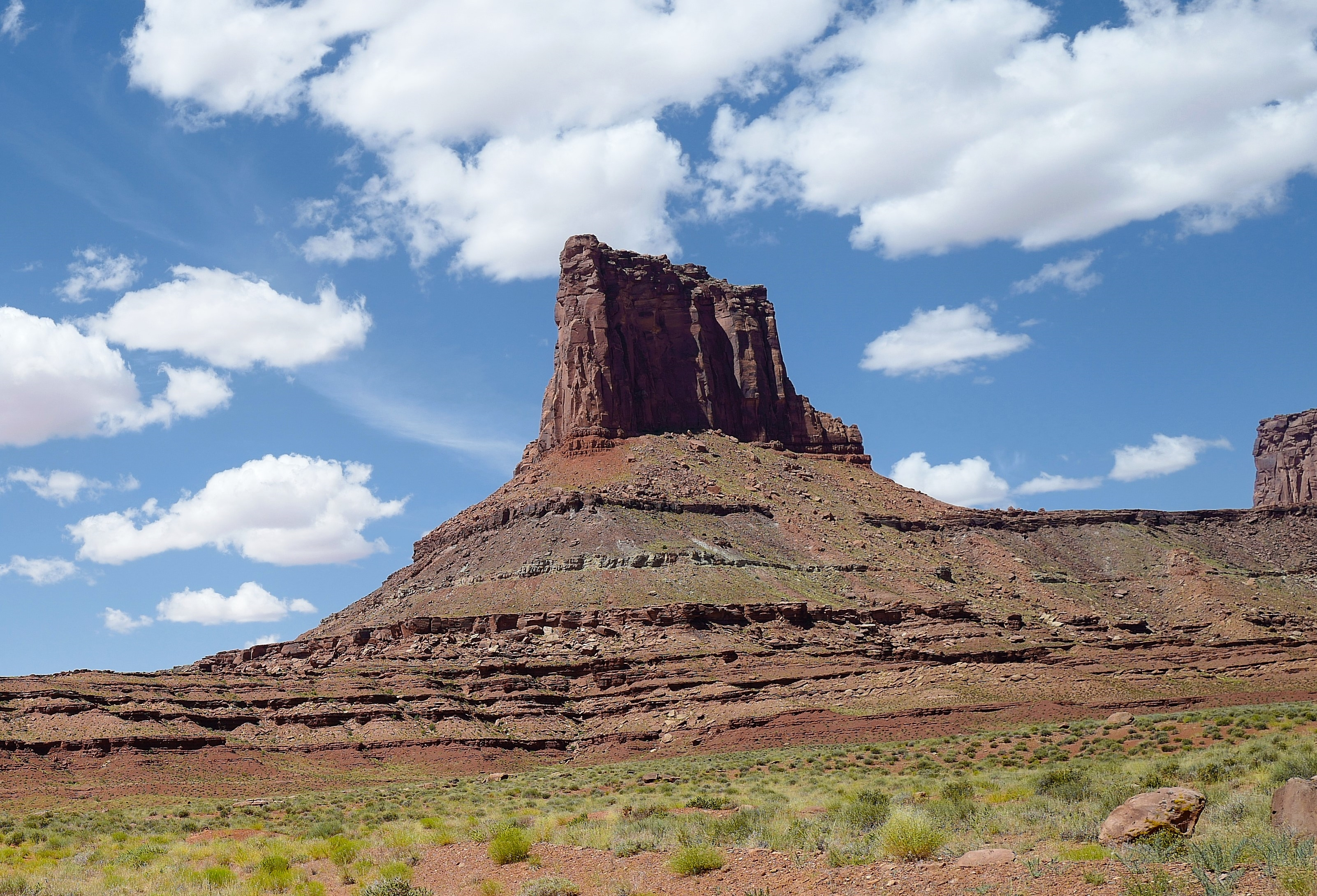
Northeast aspect

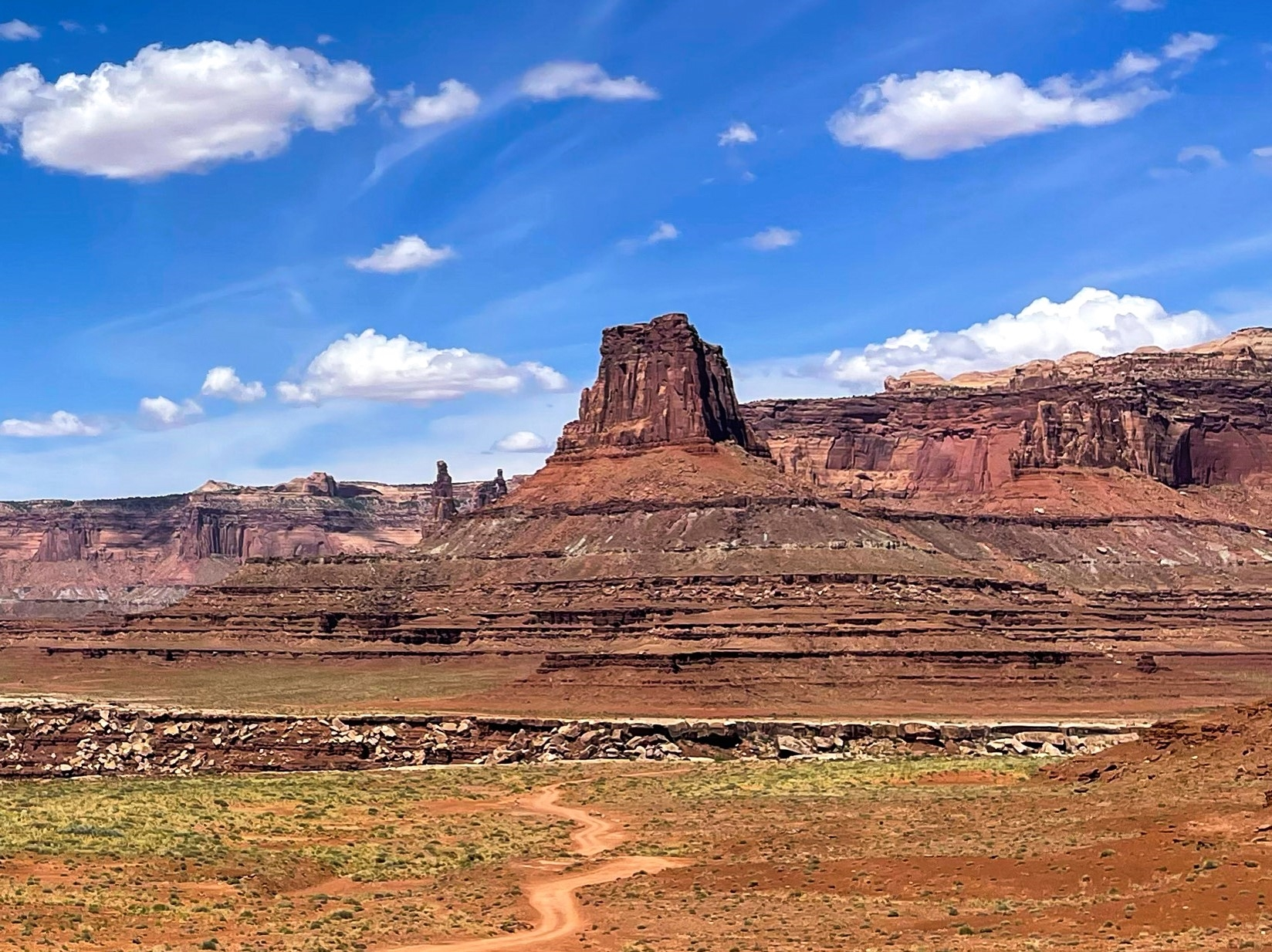
East aspect from White Rim Road

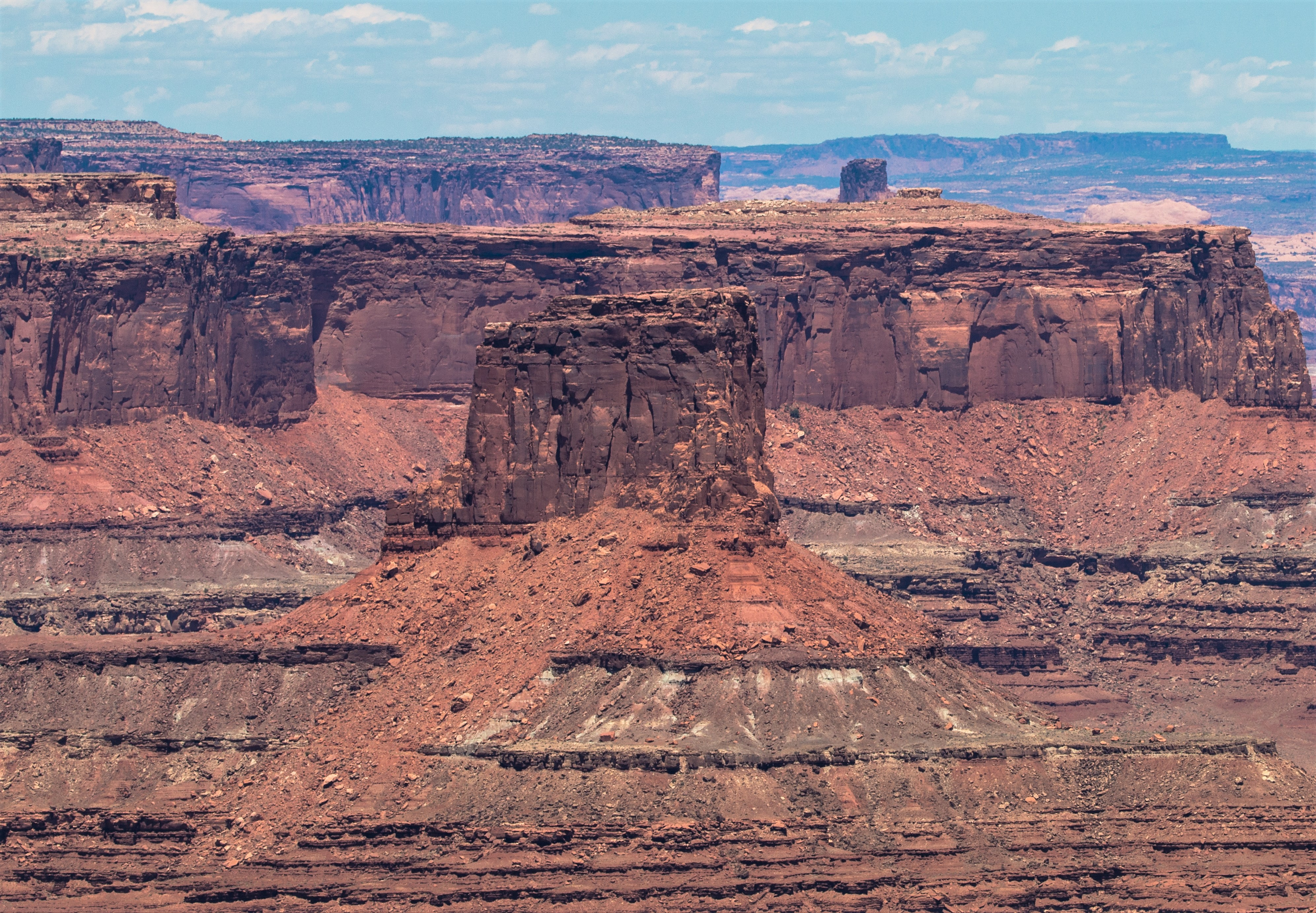
From the southwest

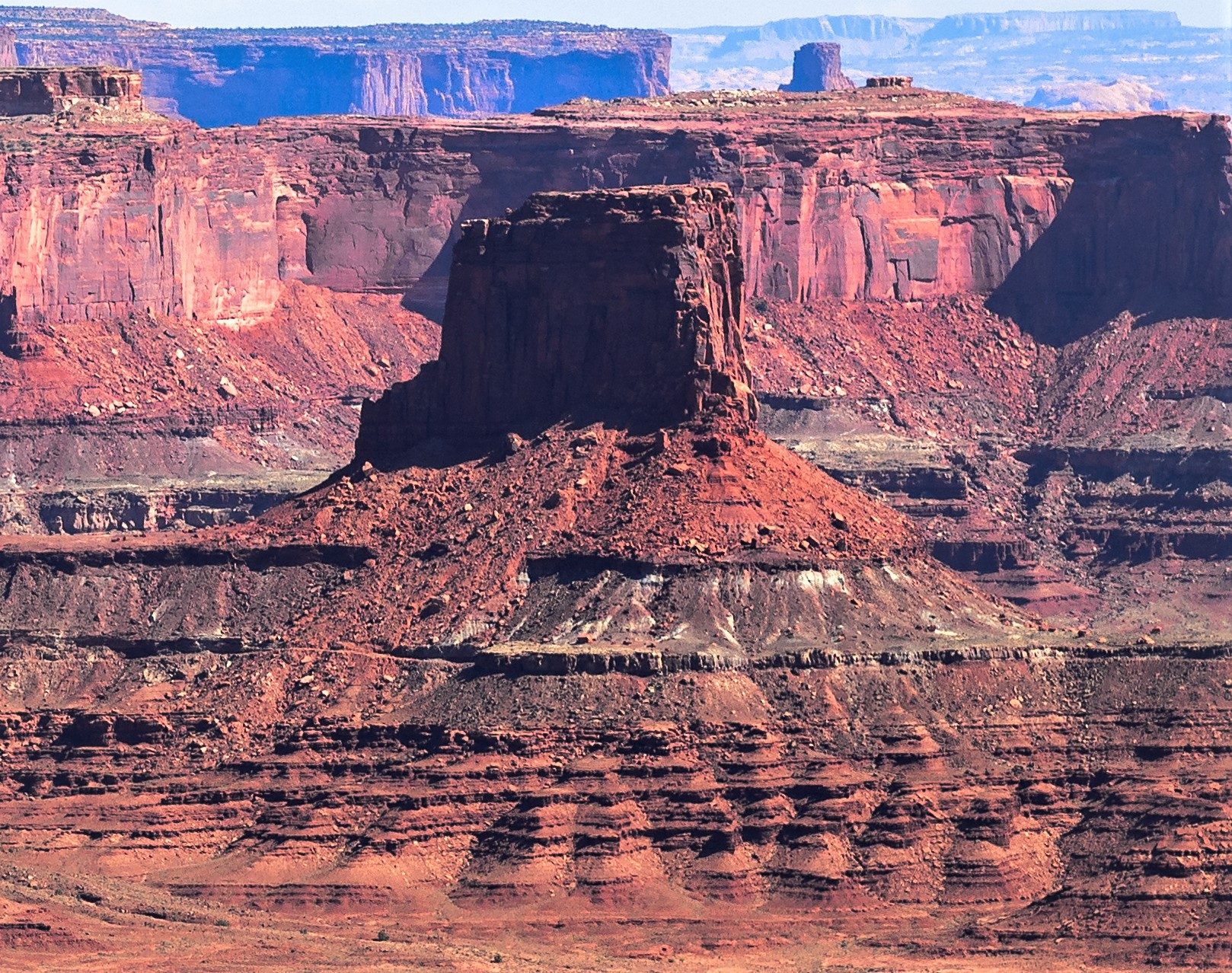
From the southwest

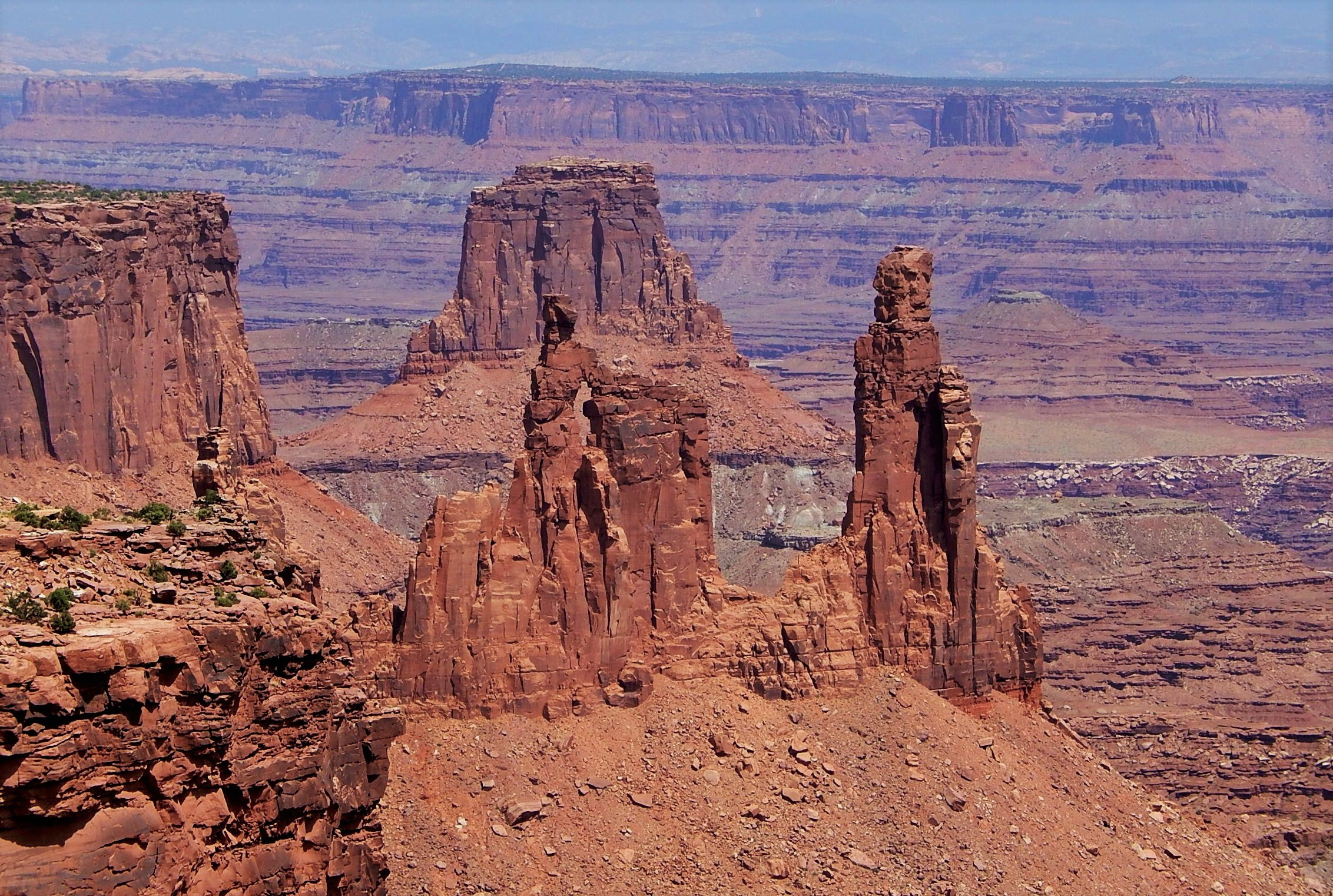
Washer Woman, Monster Tower, and Airport Tower seen from west.
United Nations Tablet on skyline

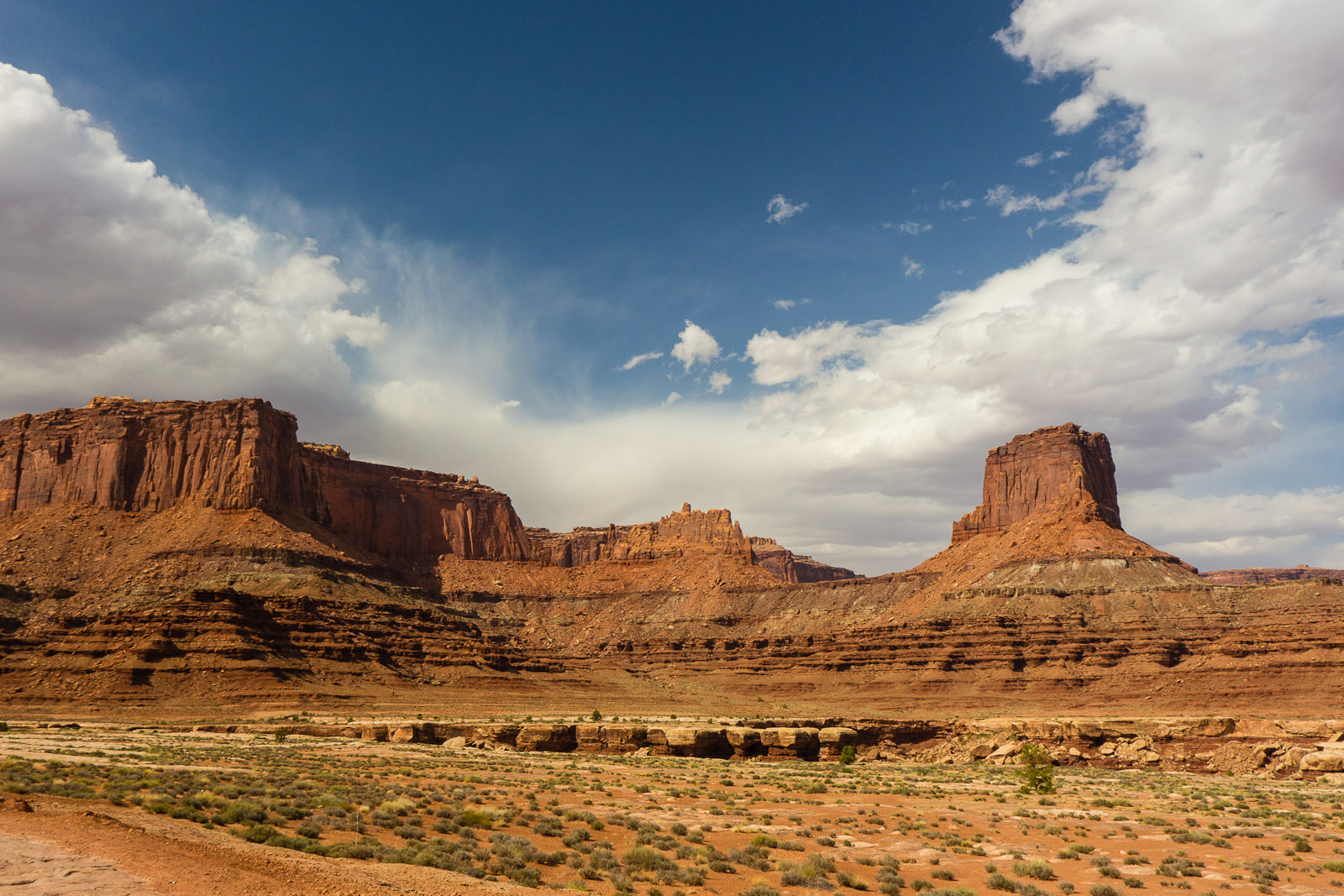
Airport Tower (right) and Island in the Sky

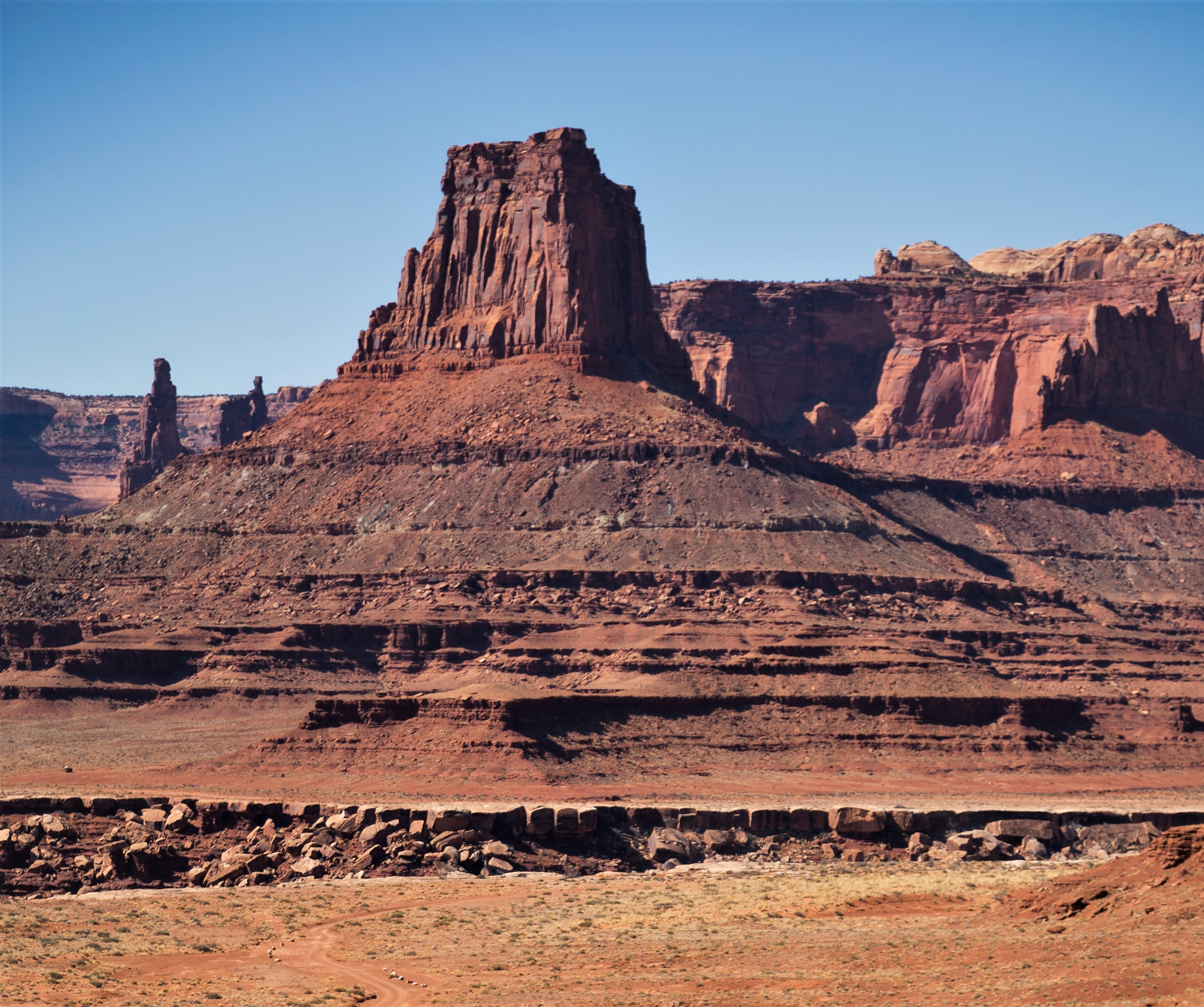
Airport Tower from the east (Monster Tower behind left)

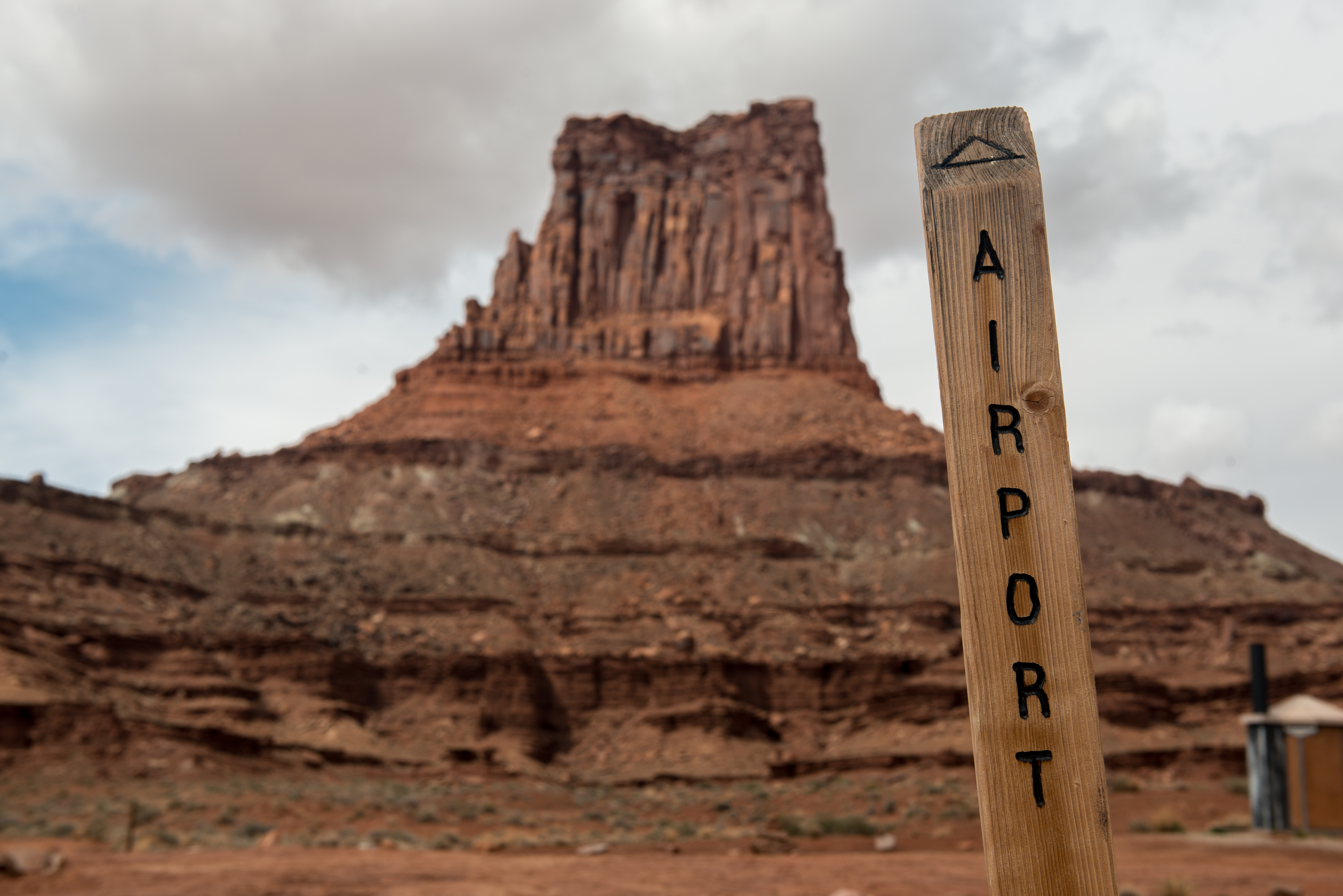
From Airport Tower Campground

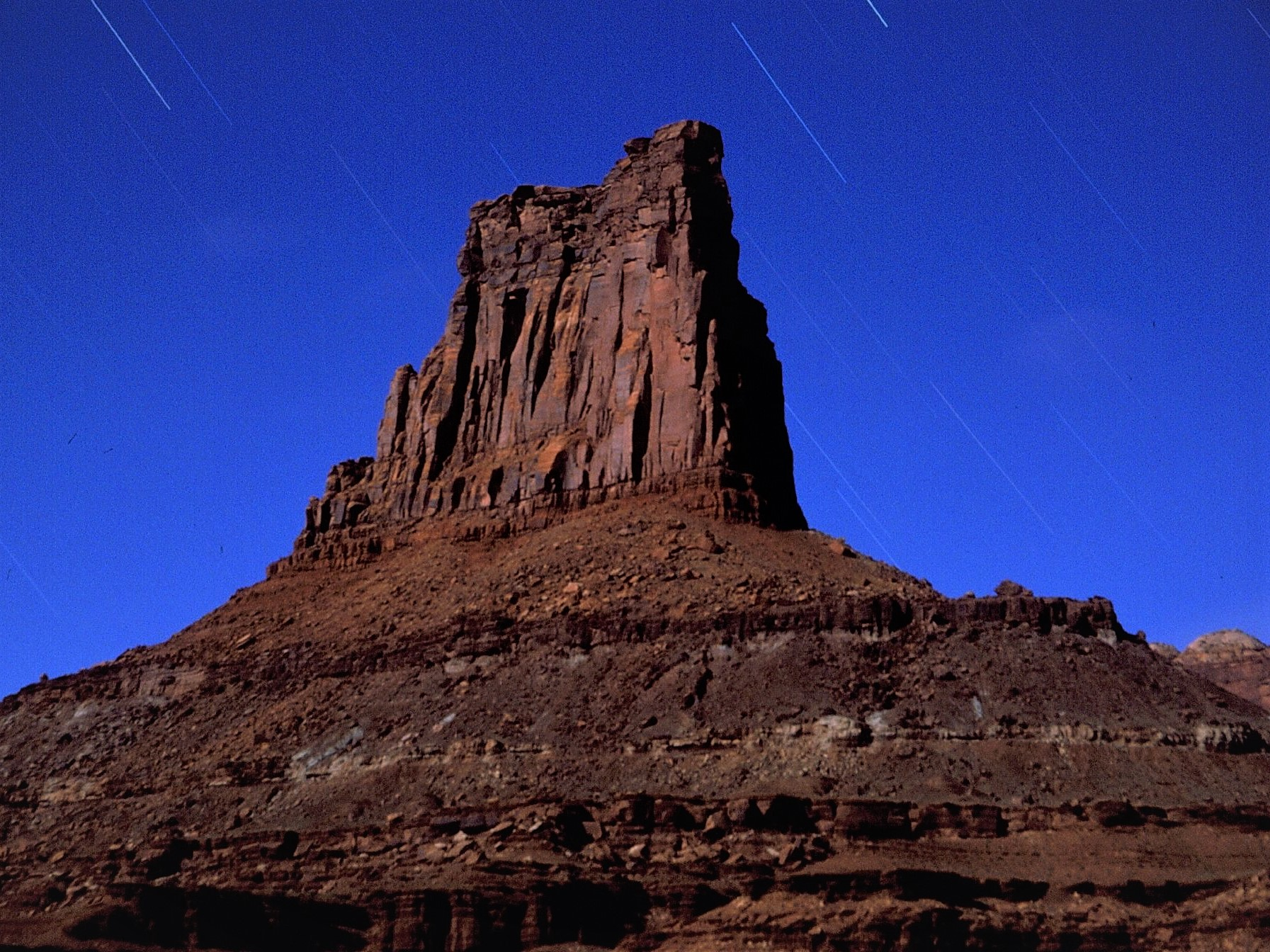
Southeast aspect and star trails

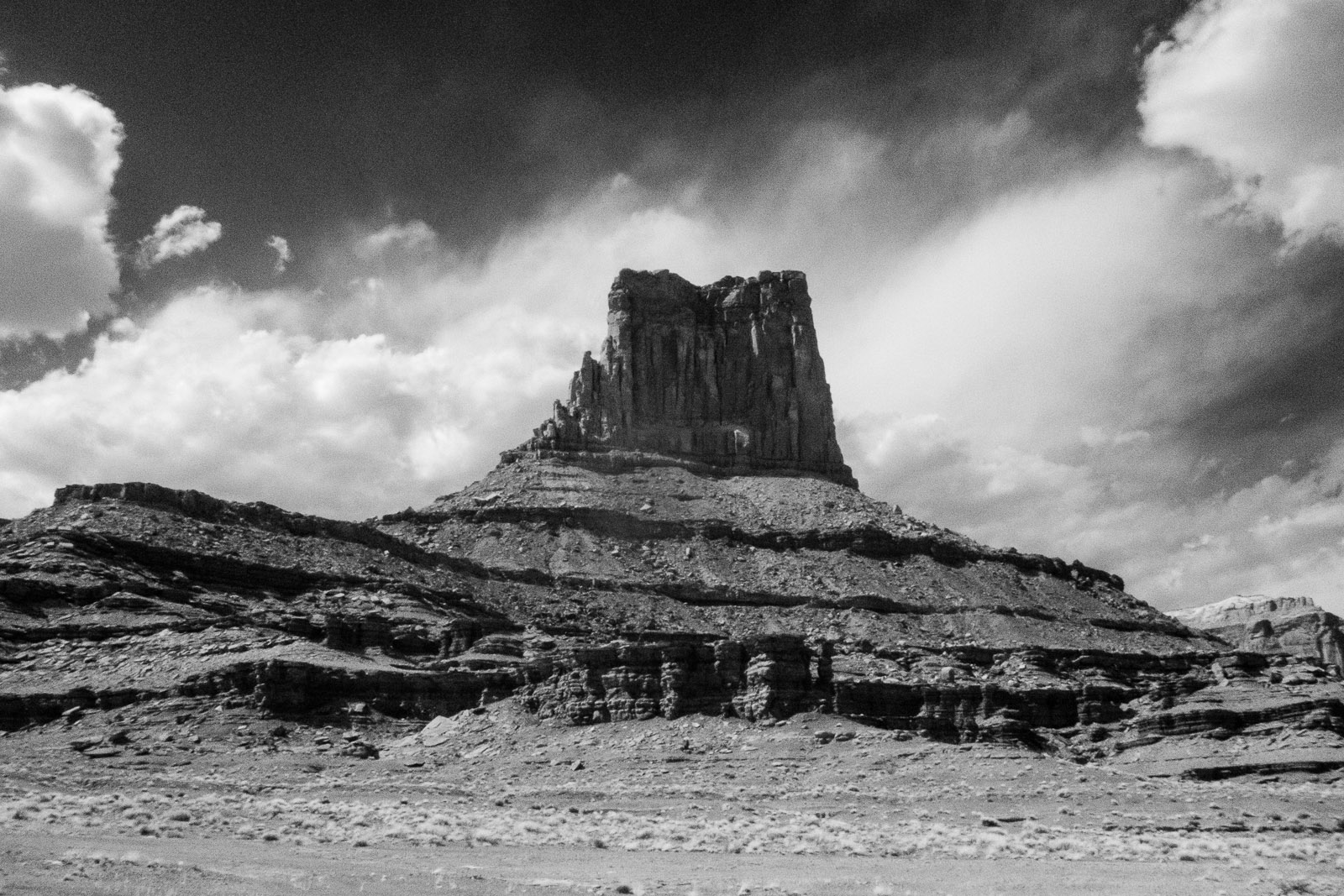

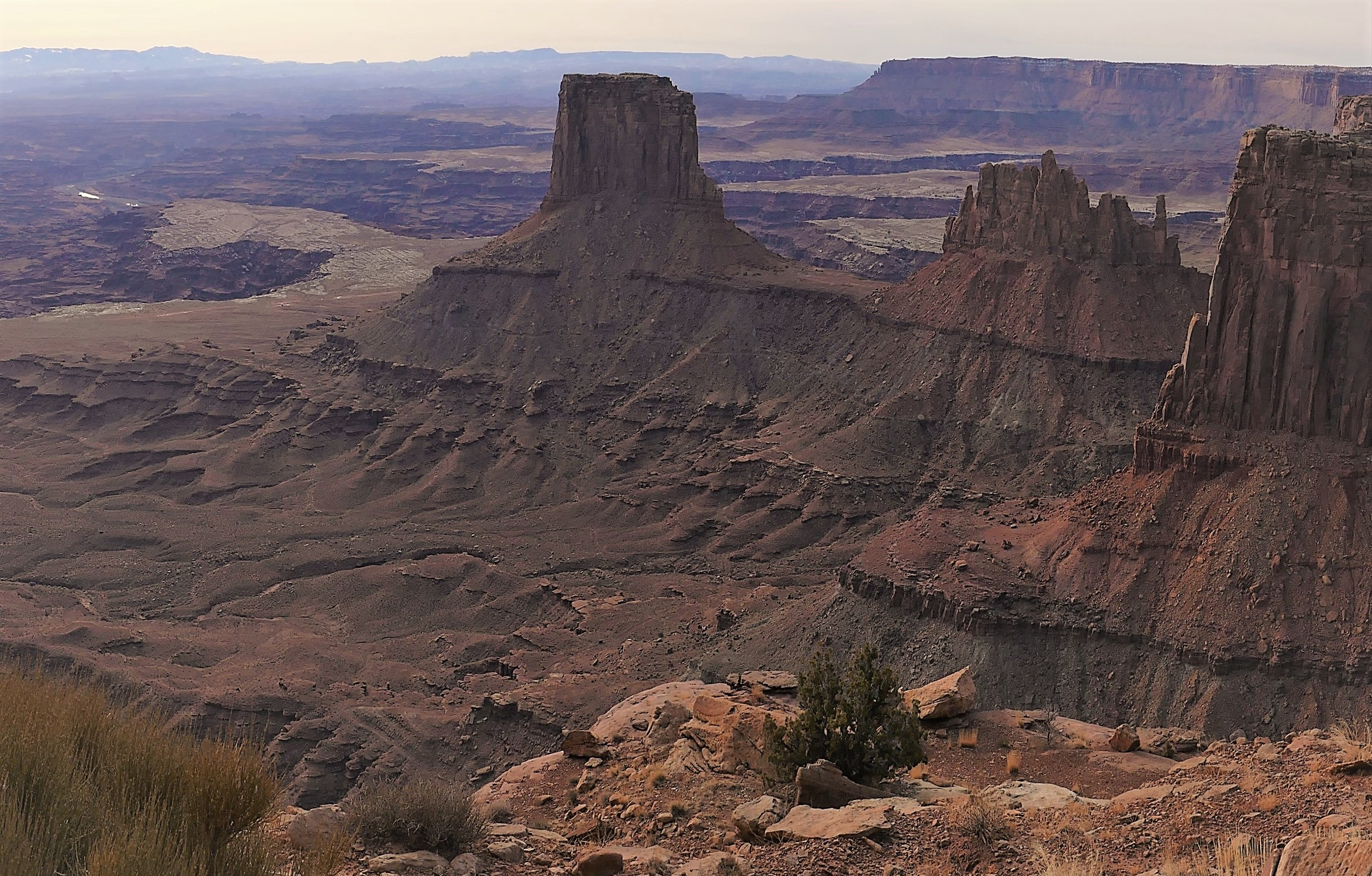
North aspect. (Tiki Tower to right)

== See also ==
- Colorado Plateau
- Geology of the Canyonlands area
