= U of N =

U of N may refer to:

- University of Nebraska–Lincoln
- University of Nevada, Reno
- University of New Hampshire
- University of New Mexico
- University of North Carolina at Chapel Hill
- University of North Dakota
- University of the Nations

== See also ==
- UN (disambiguation)
