= Mesa Arch =

Natural arch in Utah, United States

- Rock arch
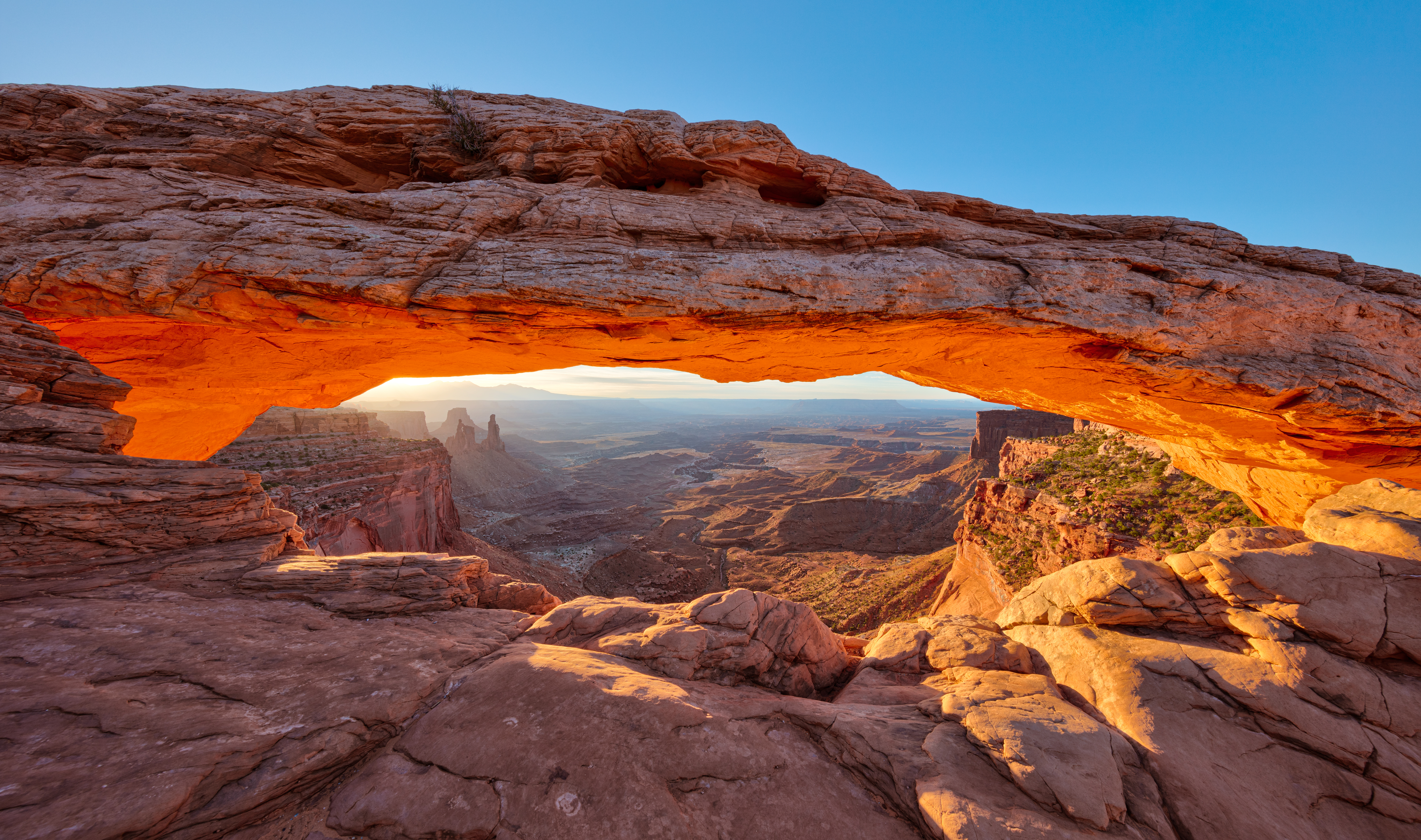
- Mesa Arch, August 2016

- Location within Utah Location within the United States
- Coordinates: 38°23′16″N 109°51′49″W
- Location: Canyonlands National Park; San Juan County, Utah, U.S.
- Geology: Navajo Sandstone
- Elevation: 1,859 m (6,099 ft)
- Topo map: USGS Musselman Arch

Mesa Arch (also known as Rotary Arch and Trail Arch) is a pothole arch on the eastern edge of the Island in the Sky mesa in Canyonlands National Park in northern San Juan County, Utah, United States. Mesa Arch is a spectacular natural stone arch perched at the edge of a cliff with vast views of canyons, Monster Tower, Washer Woman Arch, Airport Tower, and the La Sal Mountains in the distance. Access is via a relatively easy hiking trail, just a half-mile long from the park road.

Mesa Arch at sunrise in July, with the La Sal Mountains in the distance

== Climate ==
Spring and fall are the most favorable seasons to visit Mesa Arch. According to the Köppen climate classification system, it is located in a cold semi-arid climate zone, which is defined by the coldest month having an average mean temperature below −0 °C (32 °F) and at least 50% of the total annual precipitation being received during the spring and summer. This desert climate receives less than 10 inches (250 millimeters) of annual rainfall, and snowfall is generally light during the winter.
