= UNN =

UNN or Unn may refer to:

- University Hospital of North Norway, Tromsø
- University of Nigeria, Nsukka, Nigeria
- University of Northumbria at Newcastle, now Northumbria University, England
- Unnilnilium (Unn), another name for the chemical element Fermium
- N. I. Lobachevsky State University of Nizhny Novgorod, Russia
- Ranong Airport (IATA airport code)
- Union railway station, Melbourne (station code)
- Unified National Nominate, a fictional government in the 1999 video game System Shock 2
- Unn, Bhiwani, a village in Haryana, India
- Aud the Deep-Minded (Ketilsdóttir), or Unn, a 9th-century settler of Iceland
- Ukrainian National News, a news agency in Ukraine
