= United Nations (disambiguation) =

The United Nations is an international organization founded in 1945.

United Nations may also refer to:

- Allies of World War II
- United Nations Command, during the Korean War
- United Nations (band)
  - United Nations (United Nations album) (2008)
- United Nations (Rui En album) (2008)
- United Nations (gang), a gang in Vancouver, Canada
- United Nations Tablet, a butte in Utah, USA

== See also ==
- Declaration by United Nations
- Headquarters of the United Nations, in New York City
- United Nations Avenue, in Manila
- United Nations Stakes, an American Thoroughbred horse race
- RPA & The United Nations of Sound, a British alternative rock band
- Uniting Nations, a British dance act
- United Nations building (disambiguation)
