= Un, Surat =

Unn Unn
- city
- Location in Gujarat, India Unn (India)
- Coordinates: 21.115249°N 72.857037°E
- Country: India
- State: Gujarat
- District: Surat
- Talukas: Choryasi

Area
  - Total: 4 km^{2} (1.5 sq mi)
- Elevation: 40 m (130 ft)

Population (2001)
  - Total: 28,761
  - Density: 7,200/km^{2} (19,000/sq mi)

Languages
  - Official: Gujarati, Hindi
- Time zone: UTC+5:30 (IST)
- PIN: 394230
- Telephone code: 0261
- Vehicle registration: GJ5
- Website: gujaratindia.com

Unn is a Municipality city in Surat district in the Indian state of Gujarat. The city comes under Surat Metropolitan Region.

== Geography ==
Unn is located at an average elevation of 17 metres (131 feet).

== Demographics ==
As of 2001 India census, Unn had a population of 28,761. Males constitute 65% of the population and females 35%. Unn has an average literacy rate of 69%, higher than the national average of 59.5%: male literacy is 76%, and female literacy is 56%. In Unn, 14% of the population is under 6 years of age.

== See also ==
- List of tourist attractions in Surat
