= Unn, Bhiwani =

Village in the Bhiwani district

Nauranga Bass Jattan is a village in the Bhiwani district of the Indian state of Haryana. It lies approximately 43 kilometres (27 mi) south of the district headquarters town of Bhiwani.
