= Union Nationale =

Union Nationale (English: National Union) may refer to several political parties:

- Union Nationale (Quebec), Canada
- Rwandese National Union, Union nationale rwandaise in French
- National Union (Chad), Union nationale in French
- Chadian National Union, Union nationale tchadienne, known as UNT
- National Union (Switzerland), Union nationale in French

== See also ==
- National Union (disambiguation), the English equivalent to this term
