= United Nations Tablet =

Rock formation in Utah, United States

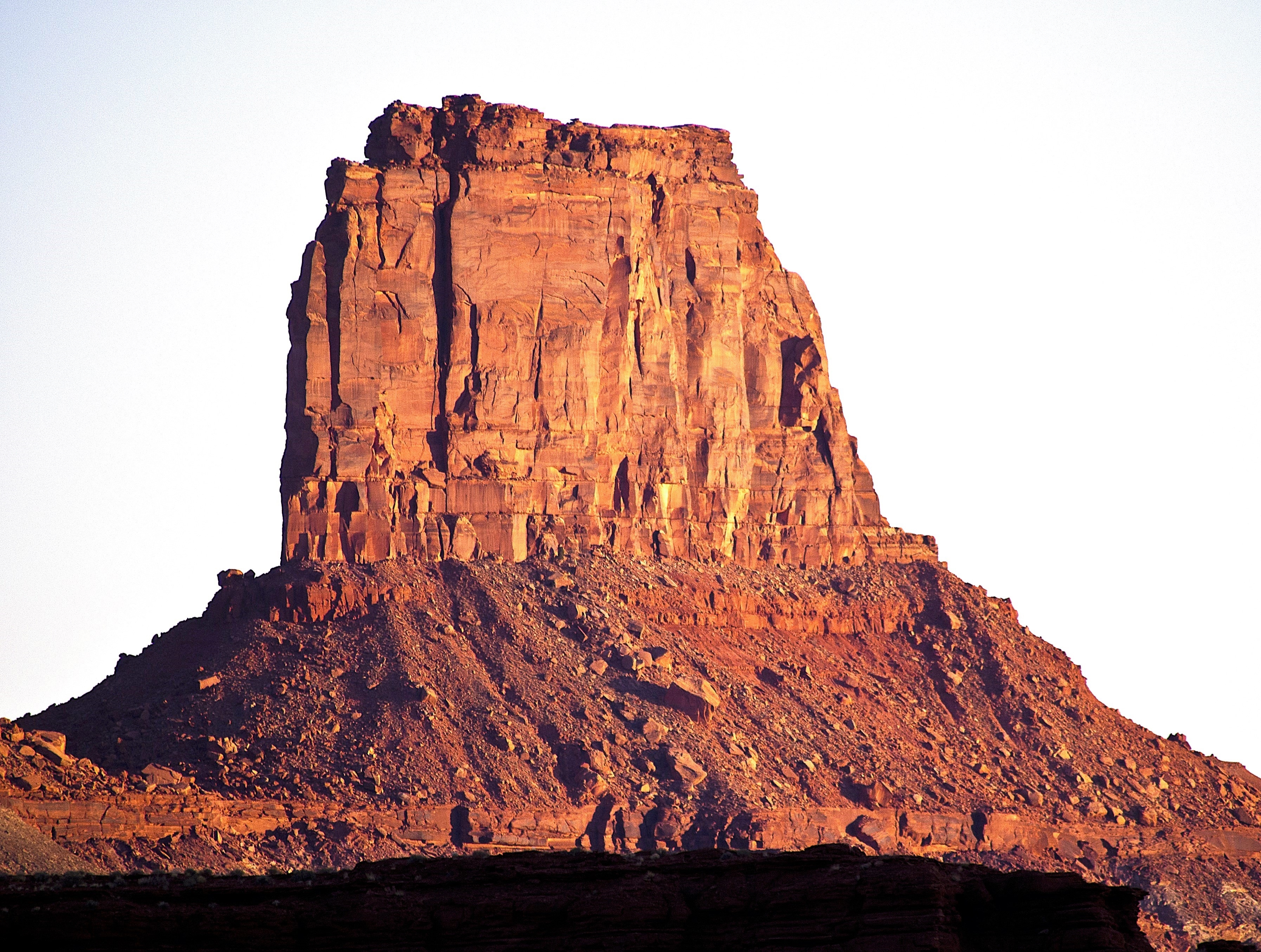
- North aspect

Highest point
- Elevation: 5,825 ft (1,775 m)
- Prominence: 580 ft (177 m)
- Parent peak: Horsehead Rock (6,500 ft)
- Isolation: 4.64 mi (7.47 km)
- Coordinates: 38°23′42″N 109°42′38″W

Geography
- Location within Utah Location within the United States
- Country: United States
- State: Utah
- County: San Juan
- Protected area: Bears Ears National Monument
- Parent range: Colorado Plateau
- Topo map: USGS Shafer Basin

Geology
- Rock age: Late Triassic
- Rock type: Wingate Sandstone

Climbing
- Easiest route: class 5.11+ climbing

United Nations Tablet is a sandstone summit located in Bears Ears National Monument, in San Juan County, Utah, United States. The summit rises to an elevation of 5,825 feet (1,775 meters), and topographic relief is significant as it towers 1,465 feet (447 meters) above the surrounding terrain of Canyonlands National Park one mile to its west, and 1,845 feet (562 meters) above the Colorado River in two miles. This butte is visible from Canyonlands Overlook, 0.6 mile (1 km) to the north, and from Dead Horse Point five miles (8 km) to the north. The unofficial toponym has been in use since at least 1963.

== Geology ==
United Nations Tablet is composed of hard, fine-grained Wingate Sandstone, the petrified remains of wind-borne sand dunes deposited approximately 200 million years ago, in the Late Triassic. This Wingate Sandstone forms steep cliffs as it overlays softer slope-forming Chinle Formation. Precipitation runoff from United Nations Tablet drains to the Colorado River, two miles to the west.

== Climate ==
Spring and fall are the most favorable seasons to visit United Nations Tablet. According to the Köppen climate classification system, it is located in a cold semi-arid climate zone, which is defined by the coldest month having an average mean temperature below 32 °F (0 °C), and at least 50% of the total annual precipitation being received during the spring and summer. This desert climate receives less than 10 inches (250 millimeters) of annual rainfall, and snowfall is generally light and transient during the winter.

== Gallery ==
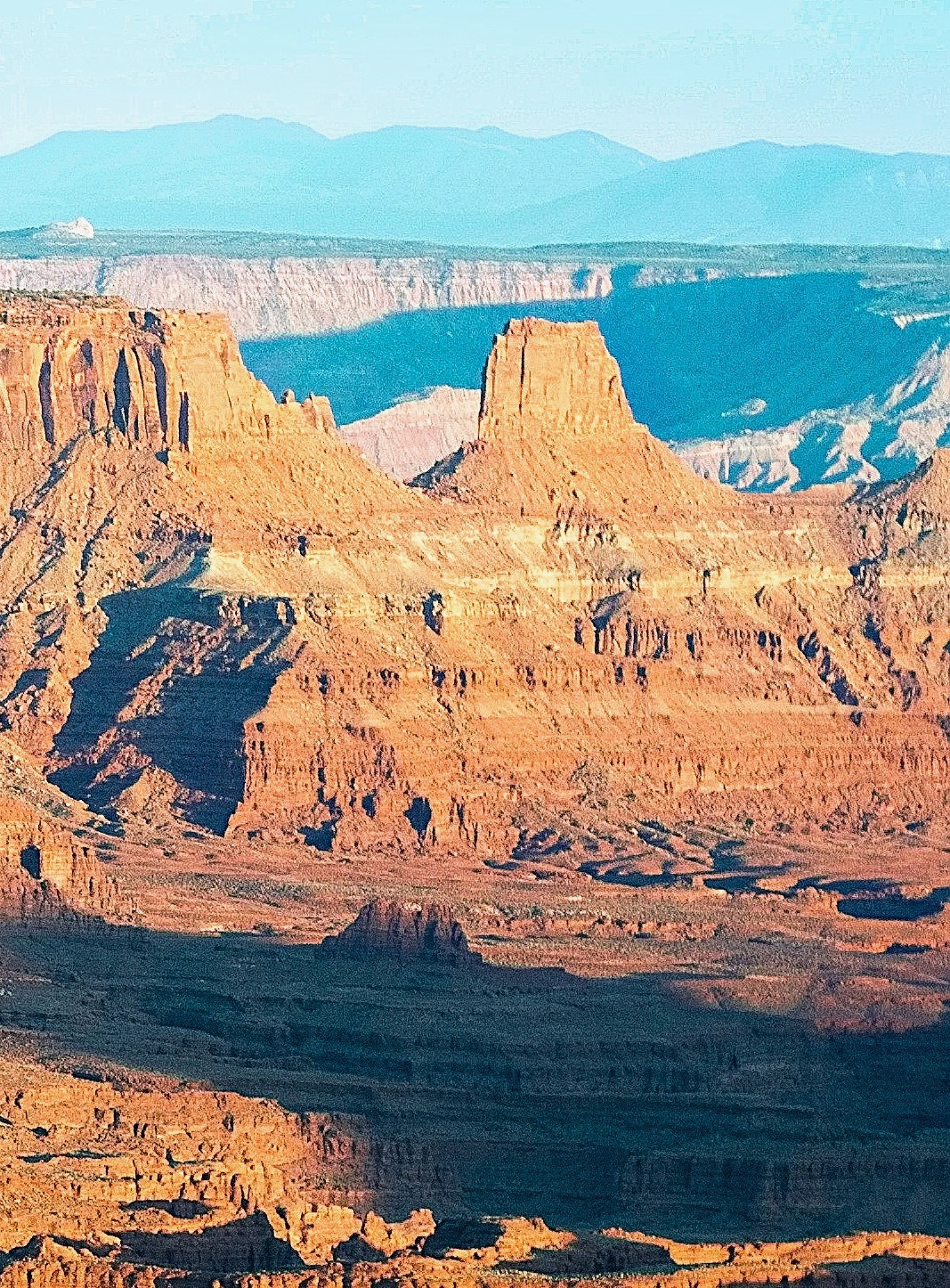
North aspect

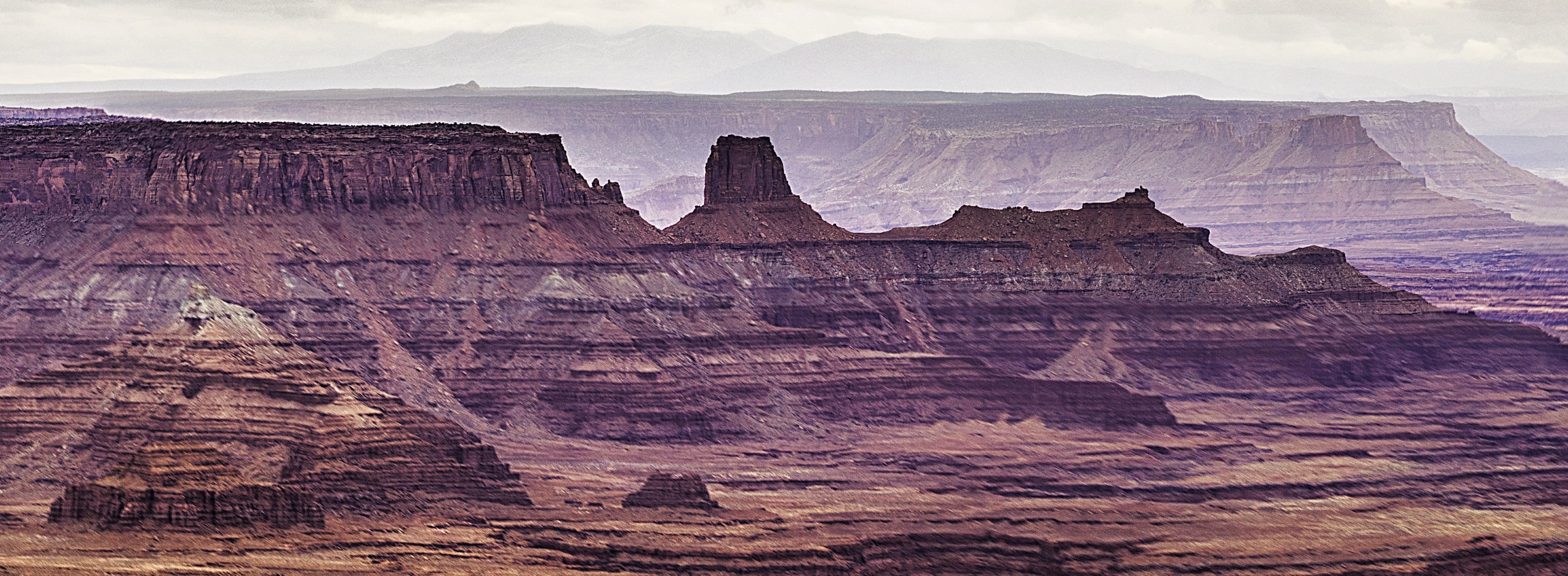
North aspect of United Nations Tablet (centered) viewed from Dead Horse Point

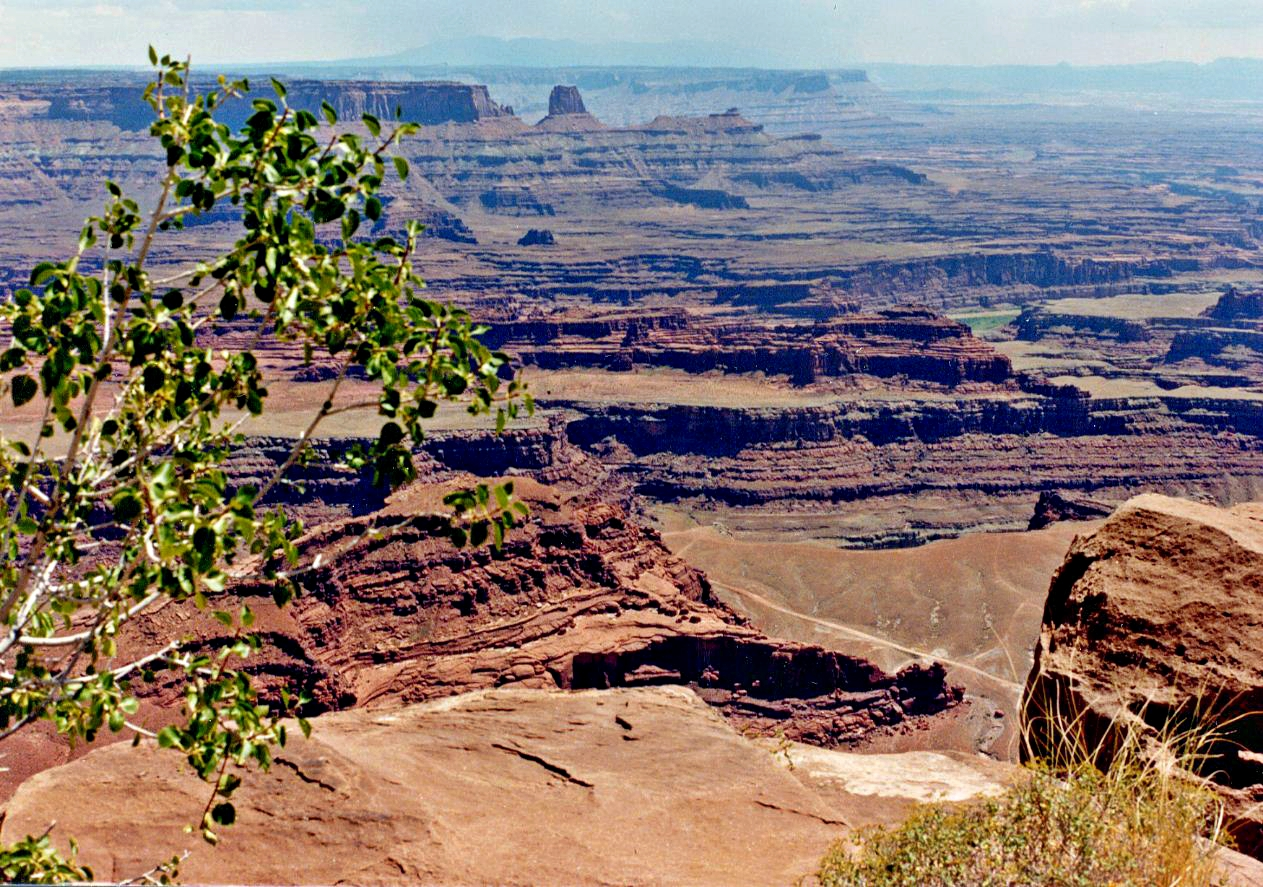
North aspect centered at top

== See also ==
- Geology of the Canyonlands area
- Colorado Plateau
