= Wingate Sandstone =

Geologic formation across the Colorado Plateau, USA

- Stratigraphic range: Rhaetian-Hettangian; ~206–199 Ma
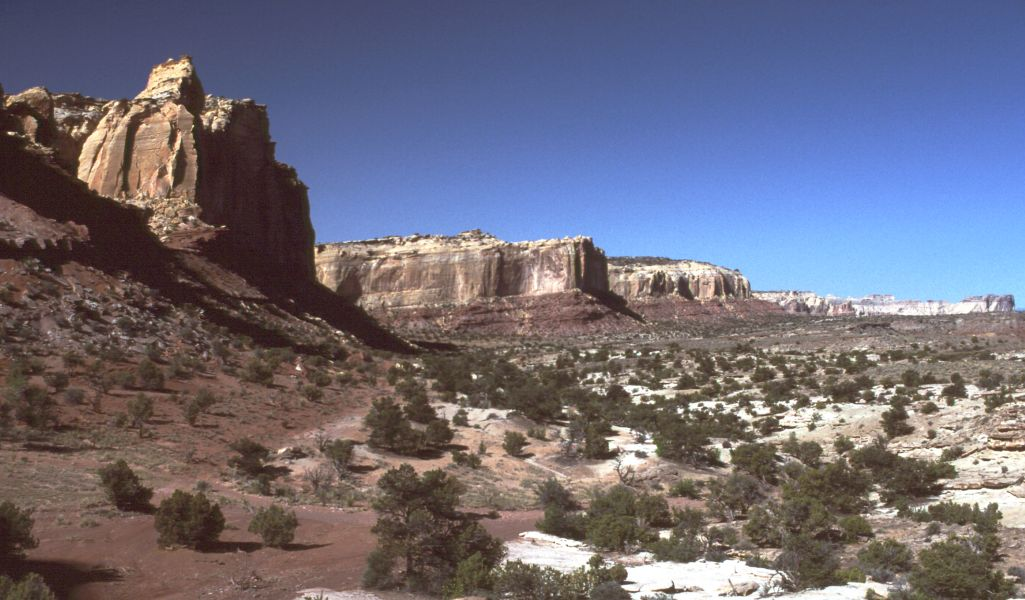
- Wingate Sandstone cliffs in the San Rafael Swell, Utah
- Type: Geological formation
- Unit of: Glen Canyon Group
- Underlies: Kayenta Formation
- Overlies: Chinle Formation

Lithology
- Primary: Eolian sandstone

Location
- Coordinates: 39.1°N 109.1°W
- Approximate paleocoordinates: 17.7°N 48.3°W
- Region: northern Arizona, northwest Colorado, Nevada, Utah
- Country: United States
- Extent: Colorado Plateau

Type section
- Named for: Fort Wingate
- Named by: C.E. Dutton
- Wingate Sandstone (the United States) Wingate Sandstone (Utah)

The Wingate Sandstone is a geologic formation in the Glen Canyon Group of the Colorado Plateau province of the United States which crops out in northern Arizona, northwest Colorado, Nevada, and Utah.

== Geology ==
Wingate Sandstone is particularly prominent in southeastern Utah, where it forms attractions in a number of national parks and monuments. These include Capitol Reef National Park, the San Rafael Swell, and Canyonlands National Park.

Wingate Sandstone frequently appears just below the Kayenta Formation and Navajo Sandstone, two other formations of the Glen Canyon group. Together, these three formations can result in immense vertical cliffs of 2,000 feet (610 meters) or more. Wingate layers are typically pale orange to red in color, the remnants of wind-born sand dunes deposited approximately 200 million years ago in the Late Triassic.

== Fossil content ==
Long dated to the Early Jurassic only, fossils (including a phytosaur skull) and other evidence indicate that part of the Wingate Sandstone is as old as Late Triassic in age. The upper part of the formation, which laterally interfingers with the Moenave Formation to the west, is Early Jurassic in age.

== Gallery ==
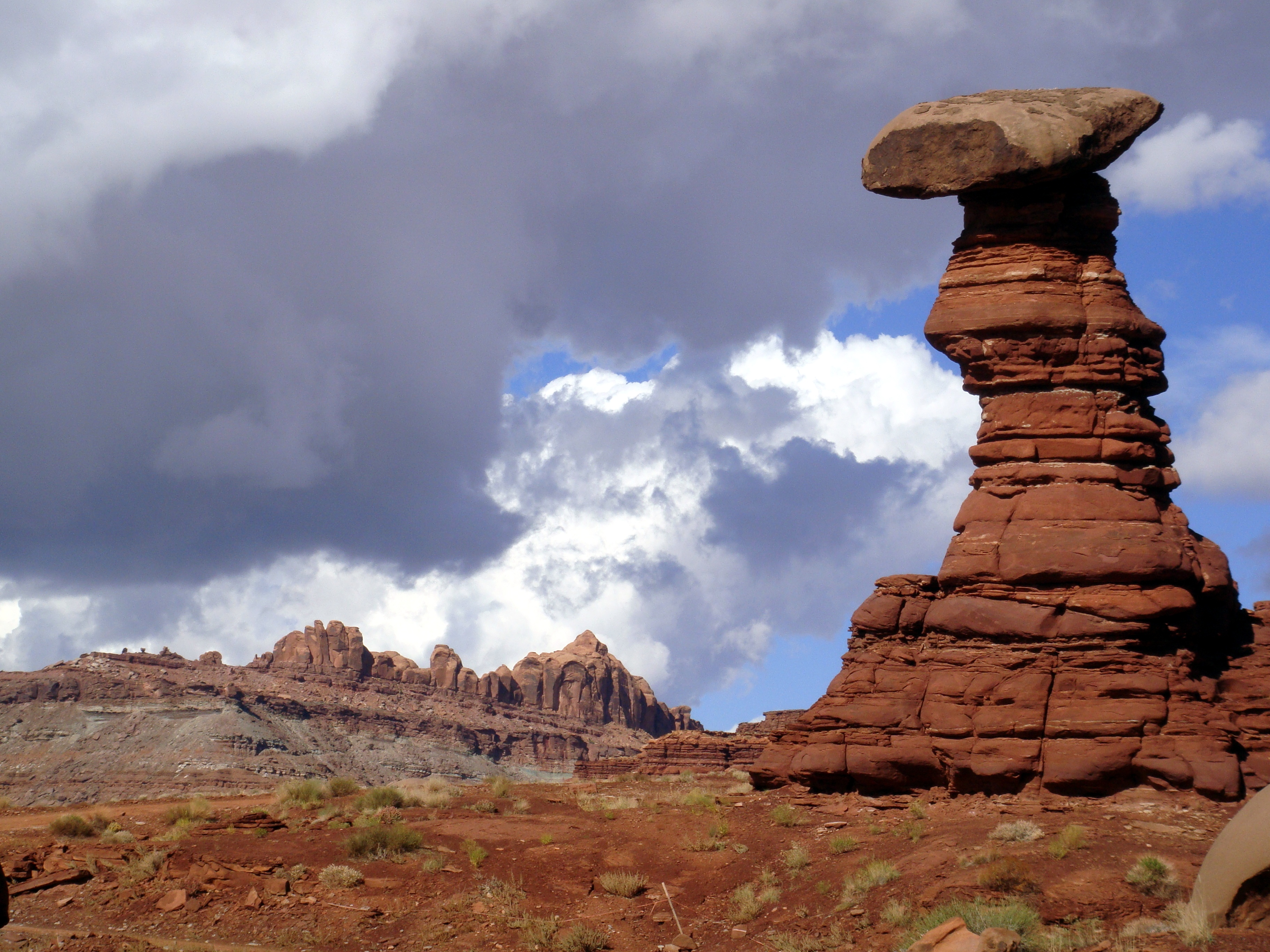
Hoodoo within the Chinle Formation, west of Moab, Utah, along the Hurrah Pass backroad. Ridge in background is part of the Wingate Sandstone.

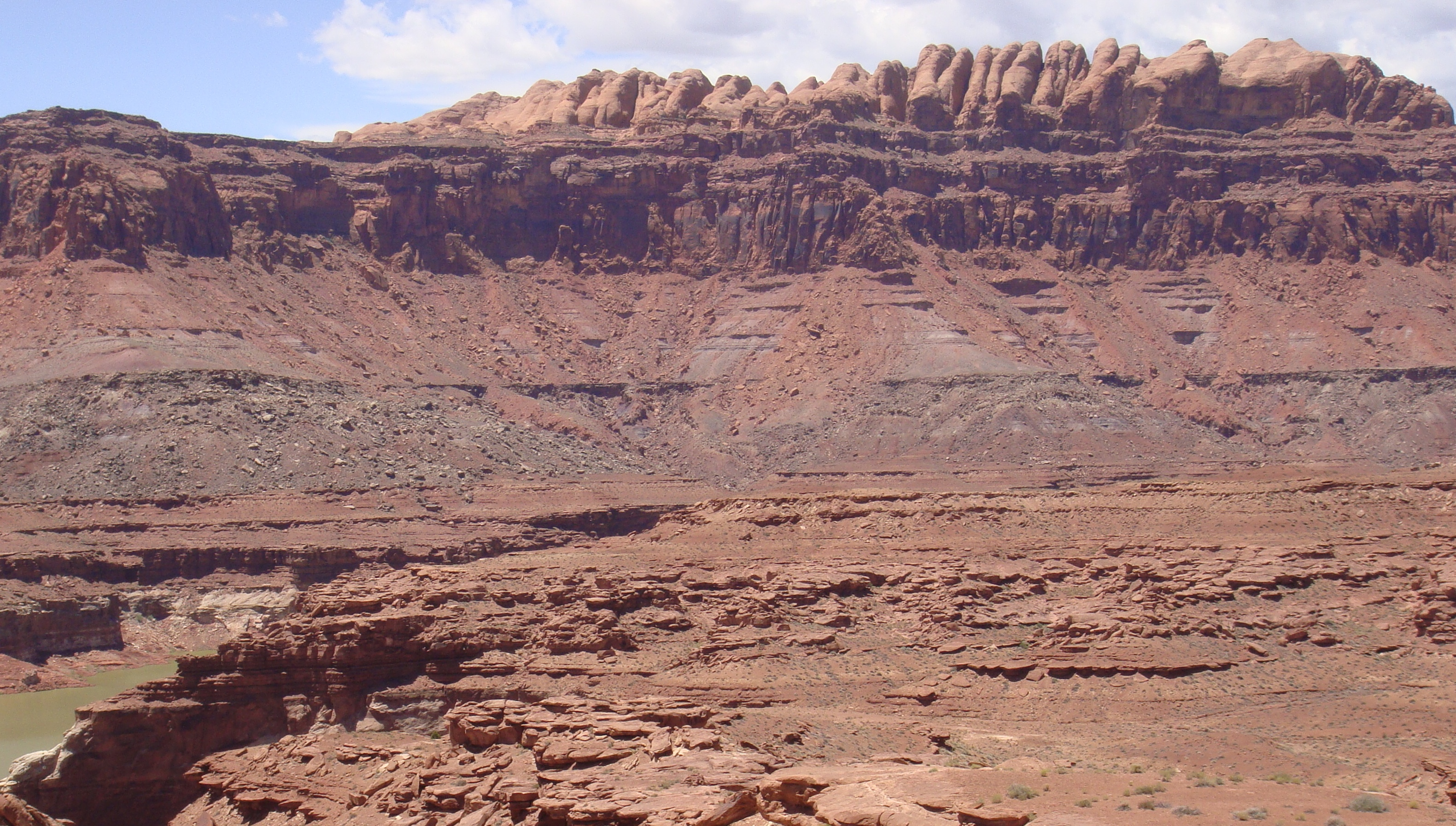
The Permian through Jurassic stratigraphy of the Colorado Plateau area of southeastern Utah that makes up much of the famous prominent rock formations in protected areas such as Capitol Reef National Park and Canyonlands National Park. From top to bottom: Rounded tan domes of the Navajo Sandstone, layered red Kayenta Formation, cliff-forming, vertically jointed, red Wingate Sandstone, slope-forming, purplish Chinle Formation, layered, lighter-red Moenkopi Formation, and white, layered Cutler Formation sandstone. Picture from Glen Canyon National Recreation Area, Utah.
