= White Rim Road =

Four-wheel-drive road in Canyonlands National Park, Utah, United States

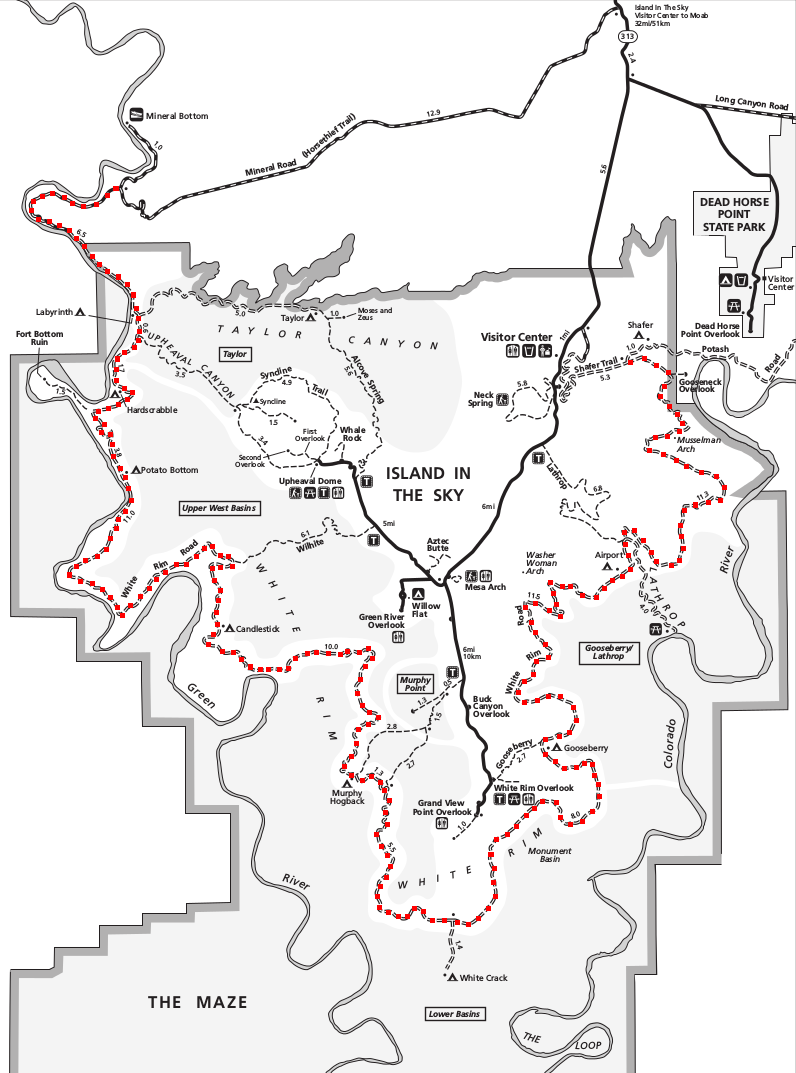
- White Rim Road highlighted in red

Route information
- Maintained by UDOT
- Length: 71.2 mi (Note: White Rim Road only, excluding spur roads and access roads.) (114.6 km)
- Existed: 1950s–present

Major junctions
- East end: Shafer Trail; Potash Road; 38°27′33.4″N 109°47′41″W
- Spurs: Lathrop Canyon — White Crack — Moses and Zeus
- West end: Mineral Bottom Road; 38°31′2.4″N 110°0′17.4″W

Location
- Country: United States
- State: Utah

Highway system
- Utah State Highway System; Interstate; US; State; Minor; Scenic

The White Rim Road is a 71.2-mile-long (114.6 km), (Note: The length of 71.2 mi (114.6 km) is measured from Shafer Trail junction to Mineral Bottom Road junction, which define the endpoints of the White Rim Road. Including both access roads but none of the spur roads, the total distance is 89.4 mi (143.9 km). Including round trips on all spur roads but excluding the access roads, the total distance is 92 mi (148 km). Including both access roads and round trips on all spur roads, the total distance is 110.2 mi (177.3 km). The average distance for a trip, depending on spur roads taken, would be approximately 100 mi (160 km), which is the number usually given for the road's length. Completing the circuit back to a starting point would add 8 mi (13 km) of the paved Island in the Sky road which links Shafer Trail and Mineral Bottom Road. All distances are based on official park map measurements between junctions.) unpaved four-wheel-drive road that traverses the top of the White Rim Sandstone formation below the Island in the Sky mesa of Canyonlands National Park in southern Utah in the United States. The road was constructed in the 1950s by the Atomic Energy Commission to provide access for individual prospectors intent on mining uranium deposits for use in nuclear weapons production during the Cold War. Large deposits had been found in similar areas within the region; however, the mines along the White Rim Road produced very little uranium and all the mines were abandoned.

The road surface consists of loose dirt, sandy dry washes and sandstone rock formations. Four-wheel-drive vehicles and mountain bikes are the most common modes of transport, though horseback riding and hiking are also permitted. Typical excursions at a modest pace take two days by four-wheel-drive vehicle and three days by mountain bike. Street-legal, registered motorbikes are also permitted to travel on the road. The National Park Service (NPS), which administers the park and maintains the road, recommends bicyclists have a motorized support vehicle to carry extra water. No potable water is available anywhere along the road and there are few river access points. The Green River is accessible at spots along the western end of the road but Lathrop Canyon is the only access point to the Colorado River near the eastern terminus. Hikers may access the White Rim from the Island in the Sky by hiking down steep trails leading to seven points along the road.

Roads leading to the White Rim Road are Mineral Bottom Road, also called Horsethief Trail, in the park's west side and Shafer Trail in the park's east side. Both roads are junctions off the Island in the Sky park road, which is an extension of Utah State Route 313. A shorter alternate from Moab is Potash Road—Utah State Route 279—in the east side of the park, which connects at the junction of White Rim Road with Shafer Trail.

Like the Shafer Trail, White Rim Road is also sometimes referred to as a trail, since a common term for a four-wheel-drive road is a Jeep trail.

== Features ==
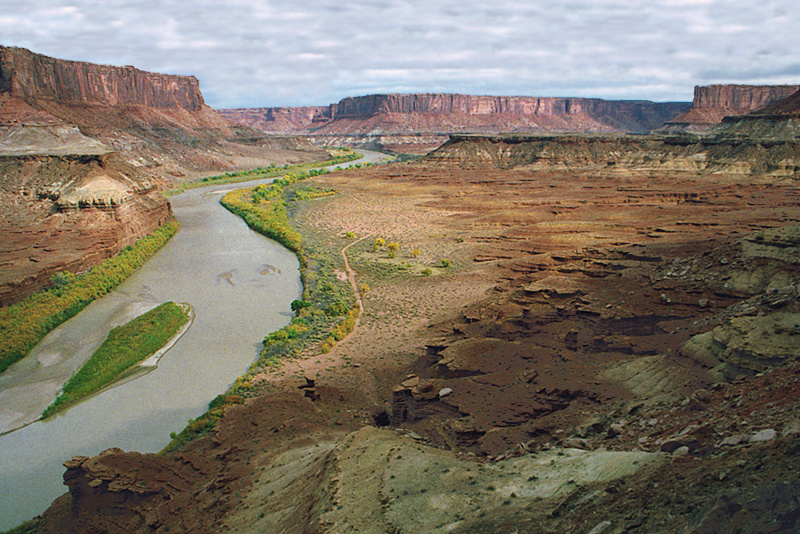
Green River from Hardscrabble Hill

Starting on Shafer Trail from the Island in the Sky mesa, a traveller will encounter hairpin turns, steep grades and cliffs with no guardrails. After a short distance along relatively flat terrain at the base of the mesa, the end of Shafer Trail is reached and the White Rim Road begins at the junction with Potash Road. The first river view is at the Gooseneck Overlook, which offers a glimpse into the Colorado River canyon at the end of a 0.6-mile (0.97 km) round-trip hike. There is no access to the river from the cliff at the overlook. Subsequent features include Musselman Arch, Airport Tower, Monster Tower, and Washer Woman, all visible from the road. A steep four-mile (6.4 km) spur road leads down to the Colorado River through Lathrop Canyon. Back on the White Rim Road, one passes Buck Canyon, Gooseberry Canyon and Monument Basin with its rock pinnacles, followed by the White Crack campground spur road. The next challenge occurs at the steep Murphy Hogback, which marks the approximate halfway point on the road. Soon after the hogback, the Turks Head butte appears in the middle of an oxbow bend of the Green River. Candlestick Tower and Potato Bottom are next, followed by a three-mile (4.8 km) round-trip hiking trail to Fort Bottom Ruin and then a steep, rocky section of road at Hardscrabble Hill and Outlaw Spire. Finally, a five-mile (8.0 km) spur road leads to two rock towers called Moses and Zeus. After crossing sandy dry washes, or arroyos, the White Rim Road ends just outside the national park boundary at the junction with Mineral Bottom Road and its hairpin turns leading one back up to the Island in the Sky.

== See also ==
- Arches National Park
- Dead Horse Point State Park
