= Merrimac Butte =

Rock formation in Utah, United States

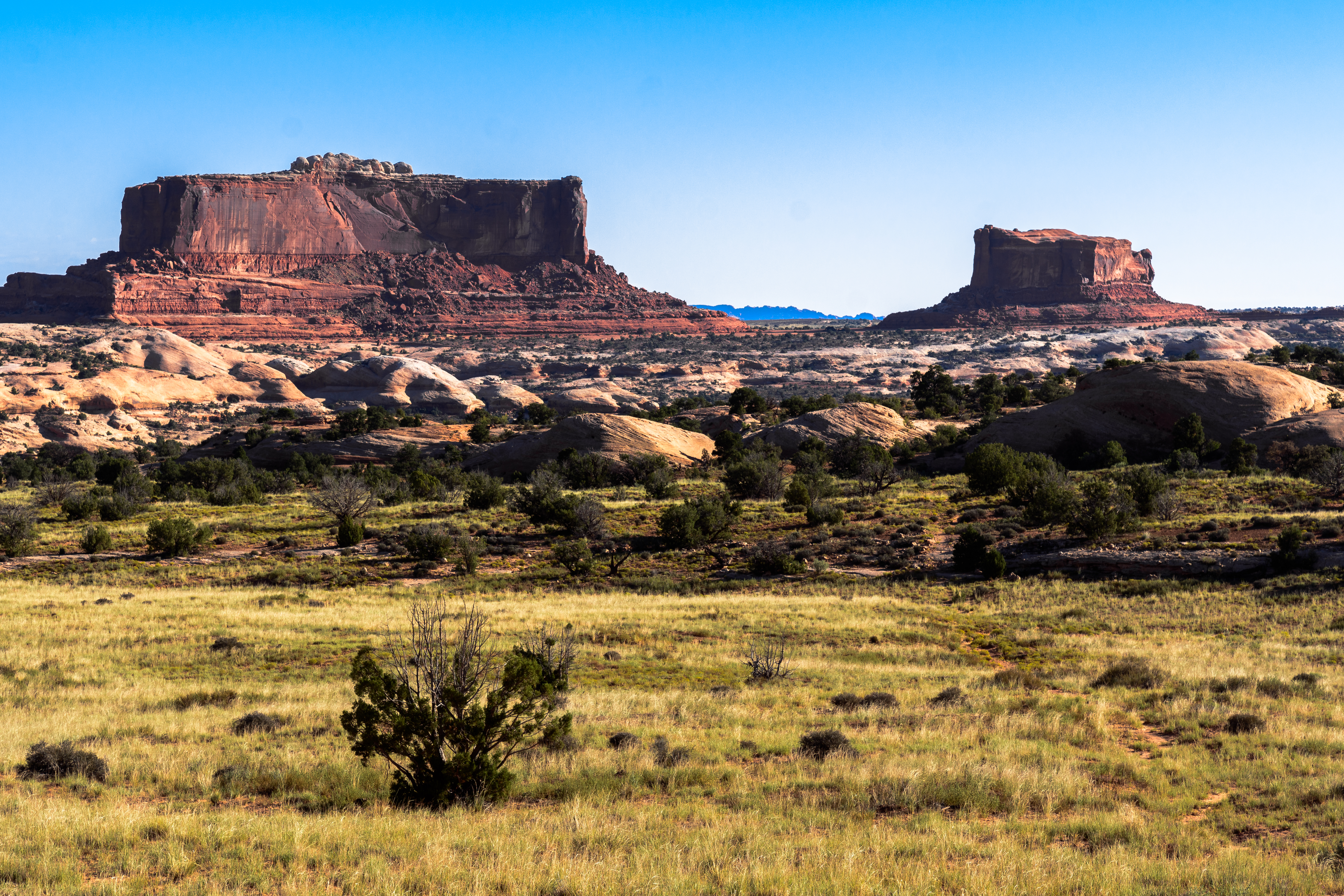
- Merrimac Butte (left) seen with Monitor Butte (right)

Highest point
- Elevation: 5,627 ft (1,715 m)
- Prominence: 637 ft (194 m)
- Coordinates: 38°39′48″N 109°44′34″W

Geography
- Location within Utah Location within the United States
- Country: United States
- State: Utah
- County: Grand
- Parent range: Colorado Plateau
- Topo map: USGS Merrimac Butte

Geology
- Rock type: Entrada Sandstone

Climbing
- Easiest route: Climbing class 5.8

Merrimac Butte is a 5,627-foot (1,715-metre) sandstone summit located in Grand County, Utah, United States, about 12 miles northwest of the town of Moab. Merrimac Butte is a thin, 200–600-foot-wide and 1,600-foot-long east-to-west butte with 200-foot-tall vertical Entrada Sandstone walls overlaying a Carmel Formation base.

Monitor Butte is situated immediately east of Merrimac Butte. The two buttes were named after the Monitor and Merrimack, two ironclad steamships known for clashing during the American Civil War. They can be seen from Highway 313 after it climbs out of Sevenmile Canyon en route to the Island in the Sky section of Canyonlands National Park or Dead Horse Point State Park.

== Climbing Routes ==
Climbing Routes on Merrimac Butte

- Ascent Into the Maelstrom - class 5.11 - 3 pitches
- Hypercrack on the Anchor Chain - class 5.11 - 2 pitches
- Hypothetical Route - class 5.10 - 1 pitch
- Keel Hauling - class 5.9+ - 3 pitches
- Merrimac Butte, The Albatross - class 5.11 - 2 pitches
- Without A Net - class 5.8 - 3 pitches

The first ascent was made September 22, 1985, by Jimmy Dunn, John Bouchard, Eric Bjornstad, and Lin Ottinger via "Hypercrack on the Anchor Chain."

"Without a Net" is the least difficult climb on Merrimac Butte and the first ascent of this route was made in April 1991 by Charlie Fowler and Sue Wint.

== Climate ==
Spring and fall are the most favorable seasons to see Merrimac and Monitor Buttes, when highs average 60 to 80 °F and lows average 30 to 50 °F. Summer temperatures often exceed 100 °F. Winters are cold, with highs averaging 30 to 50 °F, and lows averaging 0 to 20 °F. As part of a high desert region, it can experience wide daily temperature fluctuations. The area receives an average of less than 10 inches (25 cm) of rain annually.

== See also ==
- List of mountains in Utah
