= Intrepid Potash =

Fertilizer manufacturing company based in Denver, Colorado, United States

- Type: Public company
- Traded as: NYSE: IPI; Russell 2000 Component
- Founded: 2000; 26 years ago
- Headquarters: Denver, Colorado
- Key people: Kevin S. Crutchfield, CEO
- Website: intrepidpotash.com

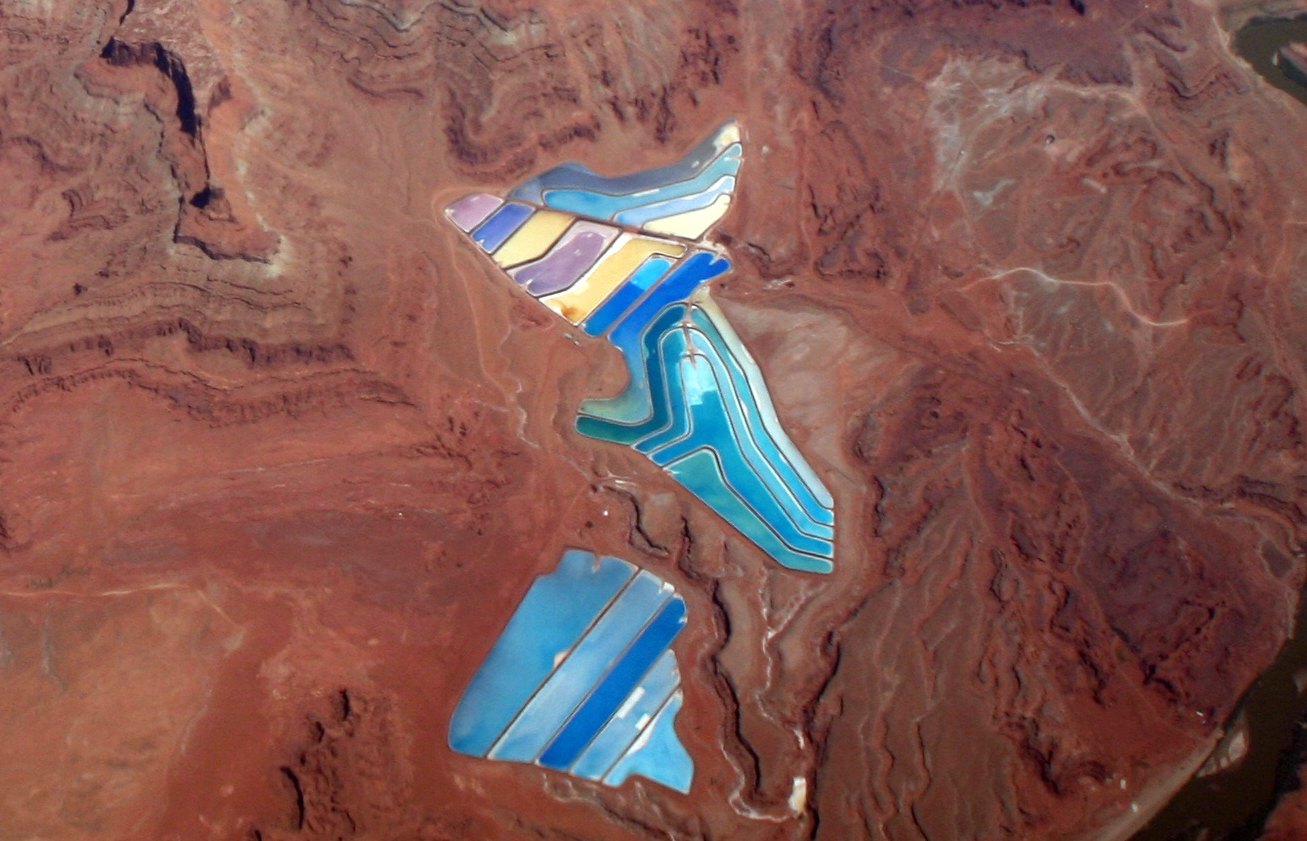
Potash evaporation ponds at the Intrepid mine near Moab, Utah, 2012. Colorado River is at the right of the frame.

Intrepid Potash, Inc. (NYSE: IPI), based in Denver, Colorado, is a fertilizer manufacturer. The company is the only producer of potassium chloride, also known as muriate of potash, in the United States. It owns three mines, all in the Western U.S., near the cities of Carlsbad, New Mexico, Moab, Utah, and Wendover, Utah.

== Mines ==
=== Carlsbad ===
There are three sites approximately 30 miles (48 km) East of Carlsbad, New Mexico. The East facility produces sylvite and langbeinite potash, and is capable of fully processing its ore to the storage or shipment stage. The West facility (currently shut down) produced mainly traditional potash, which is shipped by truck to be processed at the North facility for final storage or shipping.

=== Moab ===
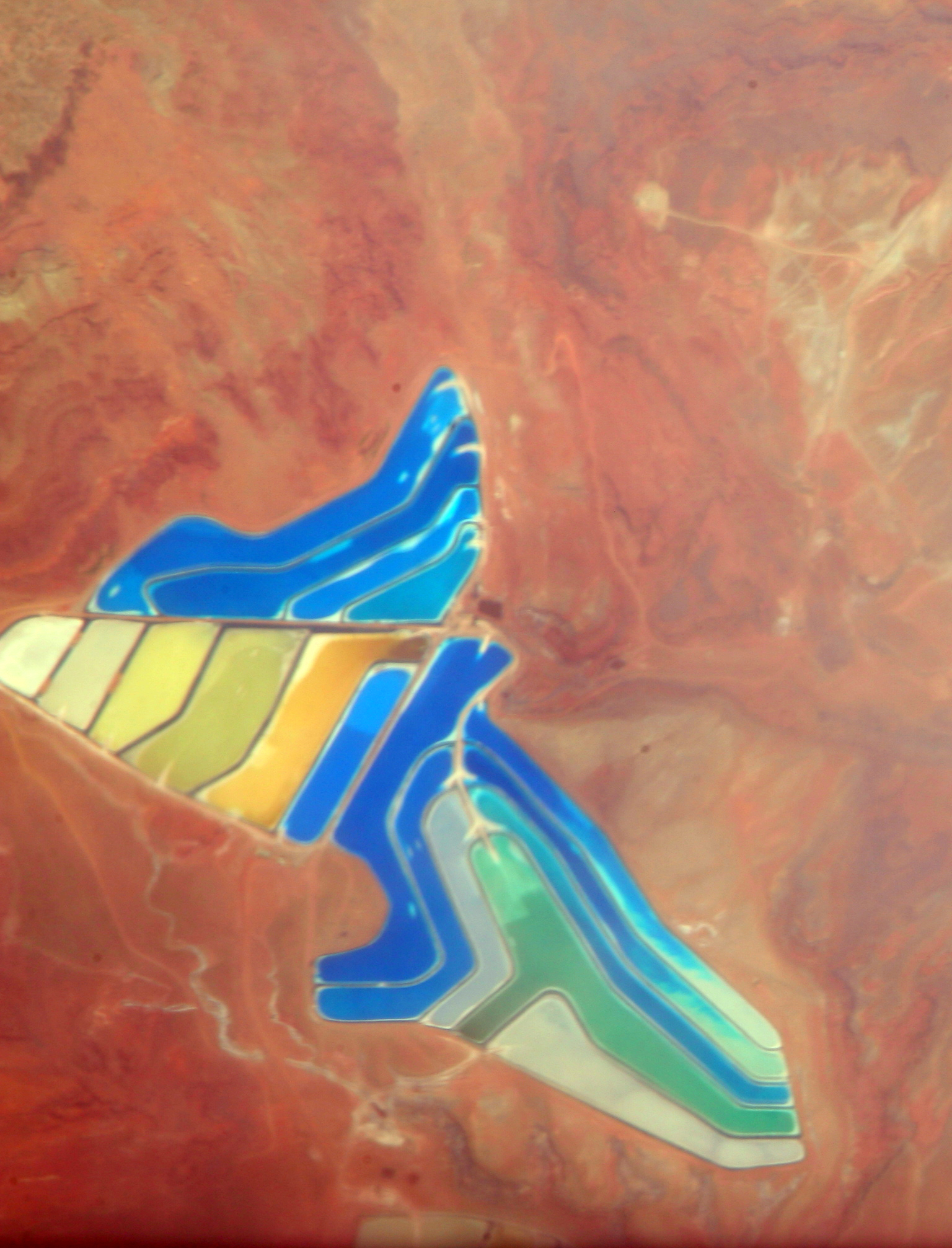
Intrepid Potash evaporation pond, Moab, 2014. The ponds appear blue due to the presence of copper sulfate, added to the water to speed up evaporation and prevent bacterial and algal growth.

The Moab or Kane Creek potash mine (38°31′25″N 109°39′15″W) is located along the right (northwest) bank of the Colorado River, about 20 miles (30 km) west of Moab, Utah, at the south end of State Route 279 and the Union Pacific Railroad. The location is known as Potash on U.S. Geological Survey (USGS) topographic maps, and is east of Dead Horse Point State Park and Canyonlands National Park. According to USGS reports, the Paradox Basin contains up to 2.0 billion tons (1.8 billion metric tonnes) of potash, with the primary mine being the one at Kane Creek.

The plant was built by the Texas Gulf Sulphur Company in the early 1960s, opening in 1963 as a conventional underground mine. Later that year, an explosion trapped 25 miners, of whom only seven were able to survive, by building a barricade to trap fresh air. In 1970, operations were changed to a system that combines solution mining and solar evaporation. River water is pumped into the mine and dissolves the potash, after which the brine solution is pumped to evaporation ponds. Intrepid bought the mine in 2000 from the Potash Corporation of Saskatchewan, which had bought Texas Gulf in 1995.

=== Wendover ===
The Wendover potash mine is located about 120 miles west of Salt Lake City, Utah, and has been actively used for potash production since 1917. Potash production from naturally occurring brines at the Wendover facility dates back to World War I. During the period from 1920 to 1936, a number of unsuccessful attempts were made to commercially produce potash. By 1939, a successful commercial potash operation was achieved and is still in production.

== Lobbying ==
In 2015, a law firm associated with former U.S. Senator Norm Coleman started lobbying the U.S. State Department on behalf of Intrepid Potash to increase sanctions against Belarus. In 2021, the United States sanctioned Belarusian potash firms, raising potash prices worldwide.
