= Utah State Route 279 =

Highway in Utah

State Route 279
- Potash-Lower Colorado Scenic Byway

Route information
- Maintained by UDOT
- Length: 15.178 mi (24.427 km)
- Existed: 1960–present

Major junctions
- South end: Potash mine along Colorado River
- North end: US-191 near Moab

Location
- Country: United States
- State: Utah

Highway system
- Utah State Highway System; Interstate; US; State; Minor; Scenic
← SR-276	→ SR-280

State Route 279 is a state highway in the U.S. state of Utah. The highway was constructed in 1962–1963 to service the Cane Creek potash mine and processing plant southwest of Moab. The highway was named one of the most beautiful highways opened to traffic in 1963. The entire length of SR-279 has been designated the Potash – Lower Colorado River Scenic Byway by the Utah State Legislature; however, it is known locally as Potash Road.

This highway was intended to be part of a longer highway, State Route 278, that was to scale the canyon walls between Moab and Dead Horse Point State Park. Only the connection to the potash mine was constructed before the project was cancelled. Although the highway was constructed to aid the mining industry of southeastern Utah, the road is popular with tourists and four wheel drive enthusiasts. The jeep trails beginning where SR-279 ends are used to access Canyonlands National Park and Dead Horse Point.

== Route description ==
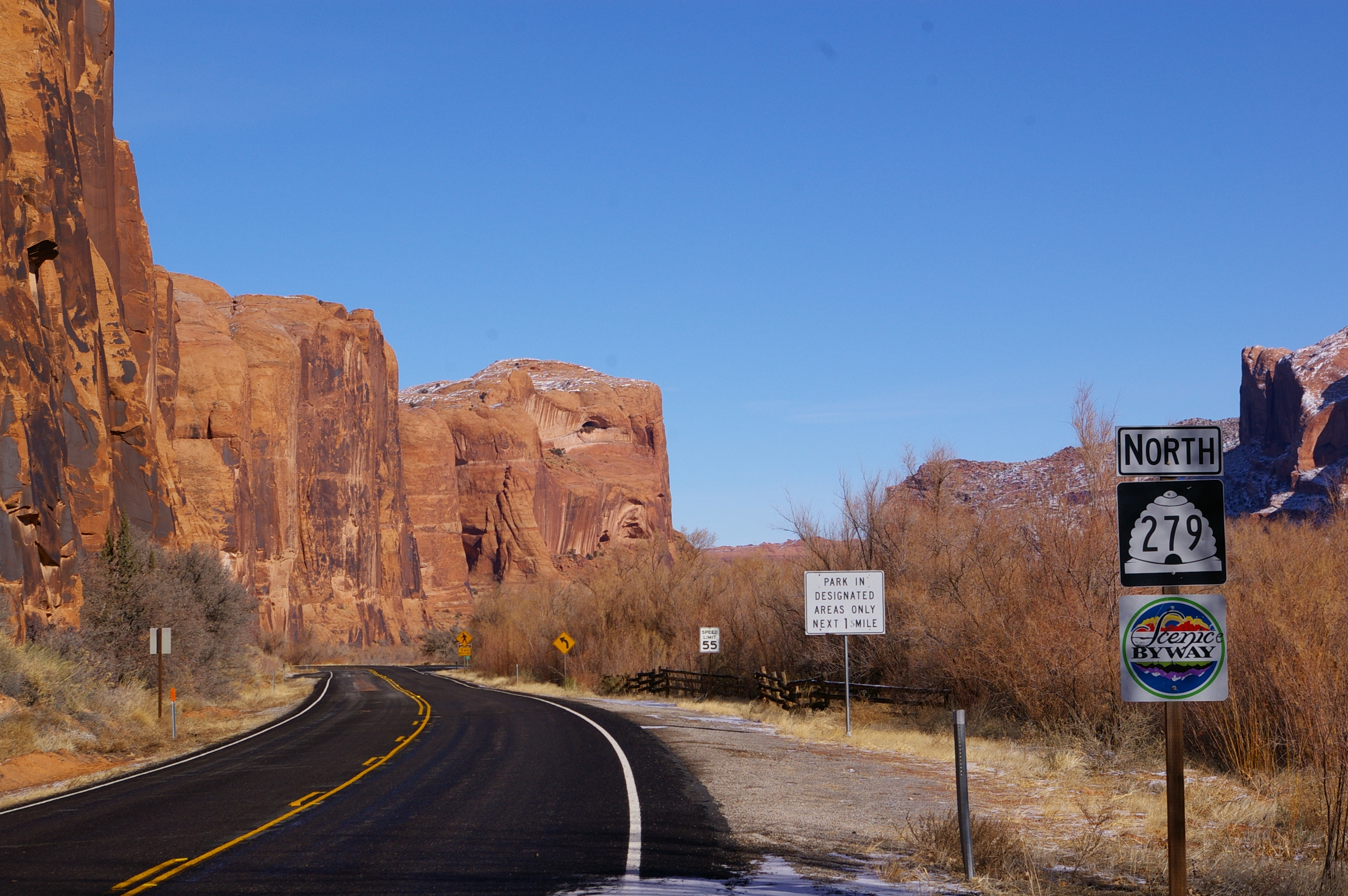
State Route 279 following the Colorado River

The highway begins just north of Moab at a junction with U.S. Route 191 near the southern boundary of Arches National Park. The road follows the north bank of the Colorado River to the potash mine. The road is legislatively designated north–south, but actually serpentines for most of its length. The highway loosely parallels a spur of the Denver and Rio Grande Railroad built at the same time and for the same purpose of serving the potash mine. The route of the railroad features a 1.59-mile (2.56 km) tunnel that bypasses most of the serpentine bends in the Colorado River between Moab and the potash plant. While in the Colorado River canyon, the highway passes by dinosaur footprints, Indian petroglyphs and jeep trails leading to Canyonlands National Park and Dead Horse Point State Park. The highway also passes by three named natural arches, Corona Arch, Bow Tie Arch, and Jug Handle Arch.

== History ==
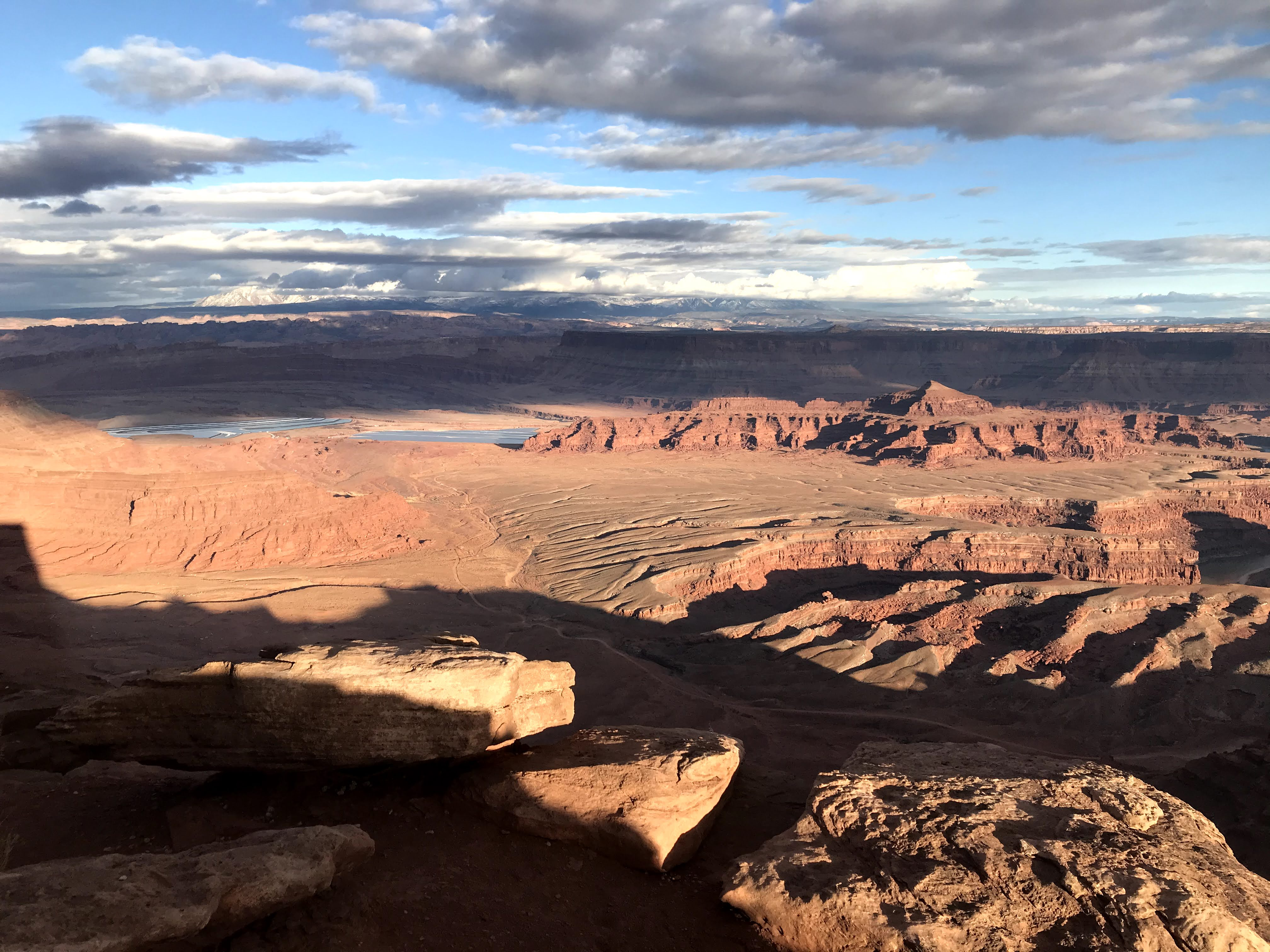
The potash mine at southern terminus of SR-279 as seen from Dead Horse Point State Park

The State Road Commission approved a new State Route 279 in 1960, connecting US-160 (now US-191) northwest of Moab with Dead Horse Point State Park. The route would be mostly new construction, following the right (northwest) bank of the Colorado River to Day Canyon, where it would climb to the southwest onto the plateau containing the park. Within the park, an existing roadway, then its primary access road, would become part of SR-279. The state legislature approved this highway in 1961. Later that year, the commission added a second route—State Route 278—that would continue south alongside the river from SR-279 to the Grand-San Juan County line. However, when it approved the addition in 1963, the legislature made it part of SR-279, renumbering the spur to the park through Day Canyon as SR-278. In addition, the south end of SR-279 was changed to Potash, a point north of the county line where the Texas Gulf Sulphur Company was building a potash plant. SR-279 was soon built, but the road through Day Canyon was never constructed. In 1975, the legislature deleted SR-278 in favor of a new SR-313, which followed the existing county road to Dead Horse Point through Sevenmile Canyon.

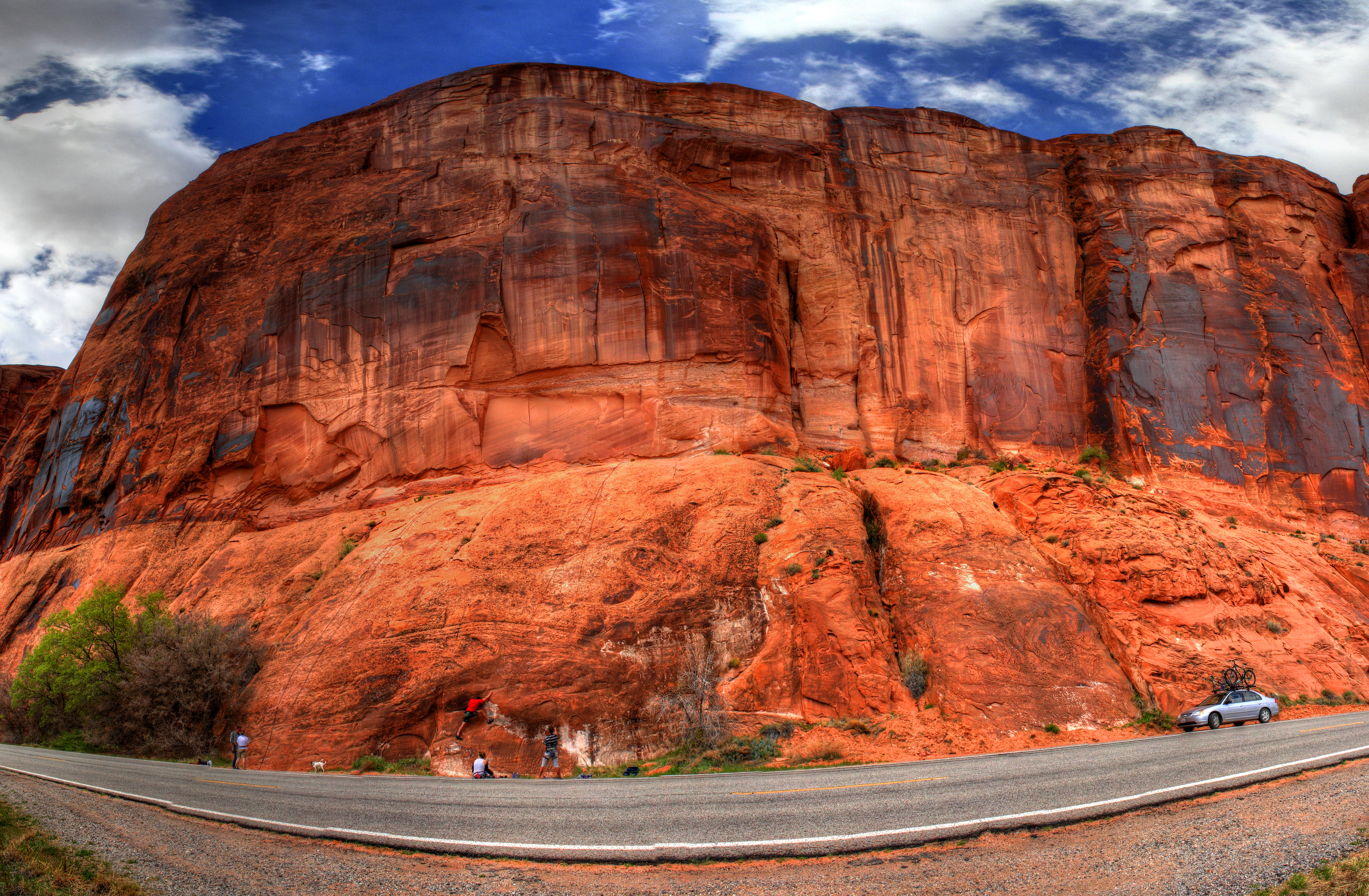
"Wall Street" along SR 279 is a popular rockclimbing area for tourists.

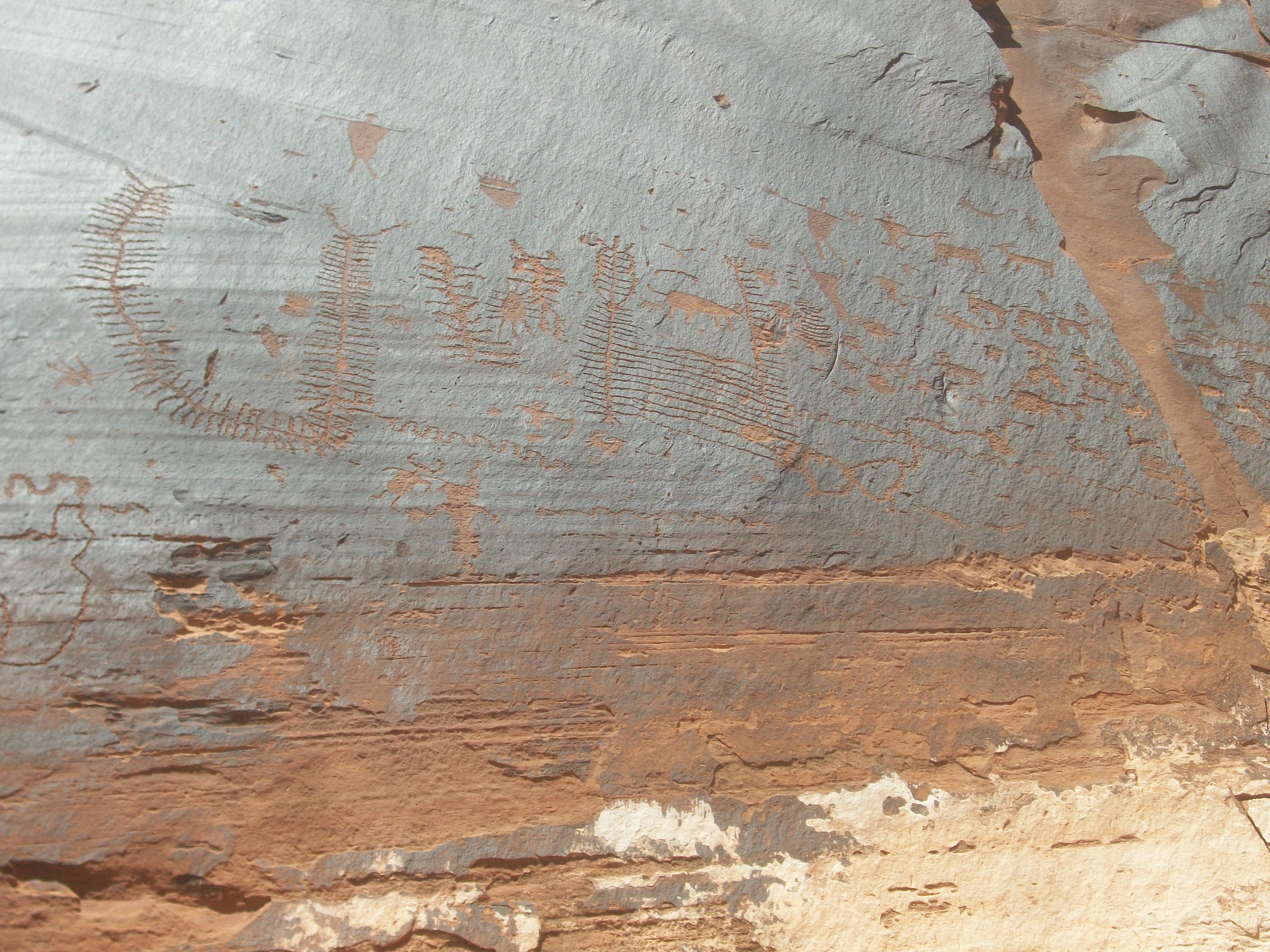
Petroglyphs inscribed on the Wall Street Canyon.

In 1963, Parade Magazine held the third of an annual competition for most scenic highway that opened to traffic that year. SR-279 was one of four finalists in the competition. The others finalists were I-93 between Windham and Londonderry in New Hampshire, I-84 near Southington, Connecticut and I-405 near Sepulveda Pass in Los Angeles, California.

== Major intersections ==
The entire route is in Grand County.

Location	mi	km	Destinations	Notes
	0.000	0.000	Potash Plant	Southern terminus
	1.678	2.700	Jug Handle Arch View area	
	5.123	8.245	Gold Bar Recreation Area and Campgrounds	
	5.294	8.520	Corona Arch/ Bow Tie Arch parking area	
	9.390	15.112	Dinosaur Footprints View Area/Poison Spider Mesa Trailhead	
	9.726	15.652	Williams Bottom Camping Area	
	11.184	17.999	Jaycee Park Recreation Site	
	15.178	24.427	US 191 – Moab, To I-70	Northern terminus
1.000 mi = 1.609 km; 1.000 km = 0.621 mi

== See also ==
- State Route 128 – Upper Colorado River Scenic Byway
