= Outlaw Spire =

- Pillar
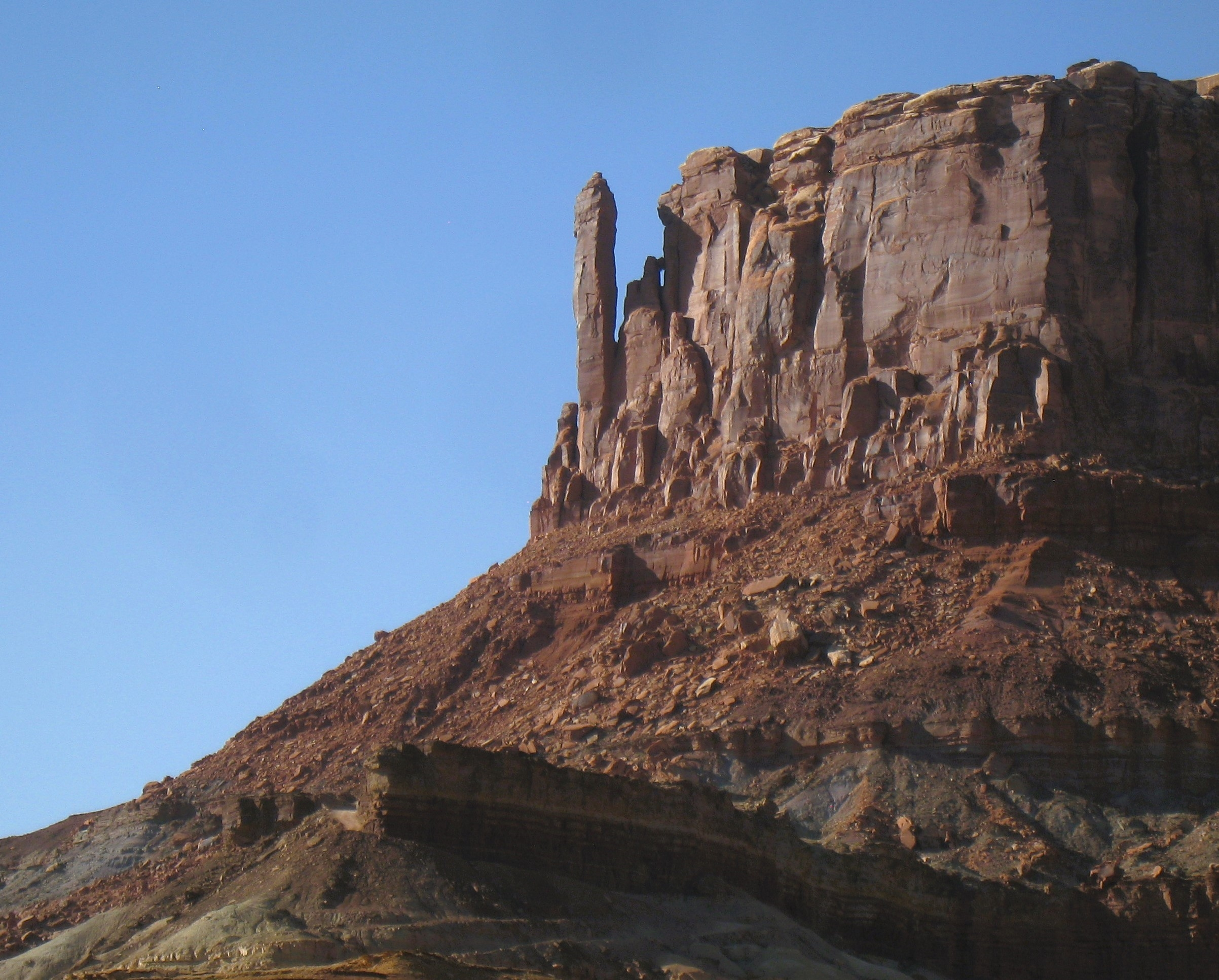
- South aspect

- Location within Utah Location within the United States
- Coordinates: 38°26′34″N 110°00′50″W
- Location: Canyonlands National Park; San Juan County, Utah, U.S.
- Age: Late Triassic
- Geology: Wingate Sandstone

Dimensions
  - Height: 230 ft (70 m)
- Elevation: 5,050 ft (1,539 m)
- Topo map: USGS Horsethief Canyon

Outlaw Spire, also known as "Hardscrabble Spire," is a sandstone pillar located within Canyonlands National Park, in San Juan County, Utah, United States. It is situated in the Island in the Sky District of the park at the top of Hardscrabble Hill at the western tip of Bighorn Mesa. This landform is composed of Wingate Sandstone, which is the remains of wind-borne sand dunes deposited approximately 200 million years ago in the Late Triassic. Precipitation runoff from Outlaw Spire drains into the nearby Green River which is 1,000 feet (305 meters) below, and less than one-quarter mile away from the tower in Labyrinth Canyon. Access is via the White Rim Road which skirts beneath this remote spire.

== Climbing ==
The first ascent of the summit was made on May 14, 1993, by Bill Ellwood and Bryan Ferguson via the South-Southwest Face. That same month, James Funsten and Chris Sircello climbed the North Face. The climbing routes are rated class 5.10 A3. In April 2001, Jim Beyer soloed the West Face via a route called Cult of Suicidal (5.9 A6).

== Climate ==
According to the Köppen climate classification system, it is located in a cold semi-arid climate zone, which is defined by the coldest month having an average mean temperature below 32 °F (0 °C) and at least 50% of the total annual precipitation being received during the spring and summer. This desert climate receives less than 10 inches (250 millimeters) of annual rainfall, and snowfall is generally light during the winter. Spring and fall are the most favorable seasons to visit Outlaw Spire.

== See also ==
- Colorado Plateau
- Geology of the Canyonlands area
