= Monster Tower =

Sandstone tower in San Juan County, Utah, United States

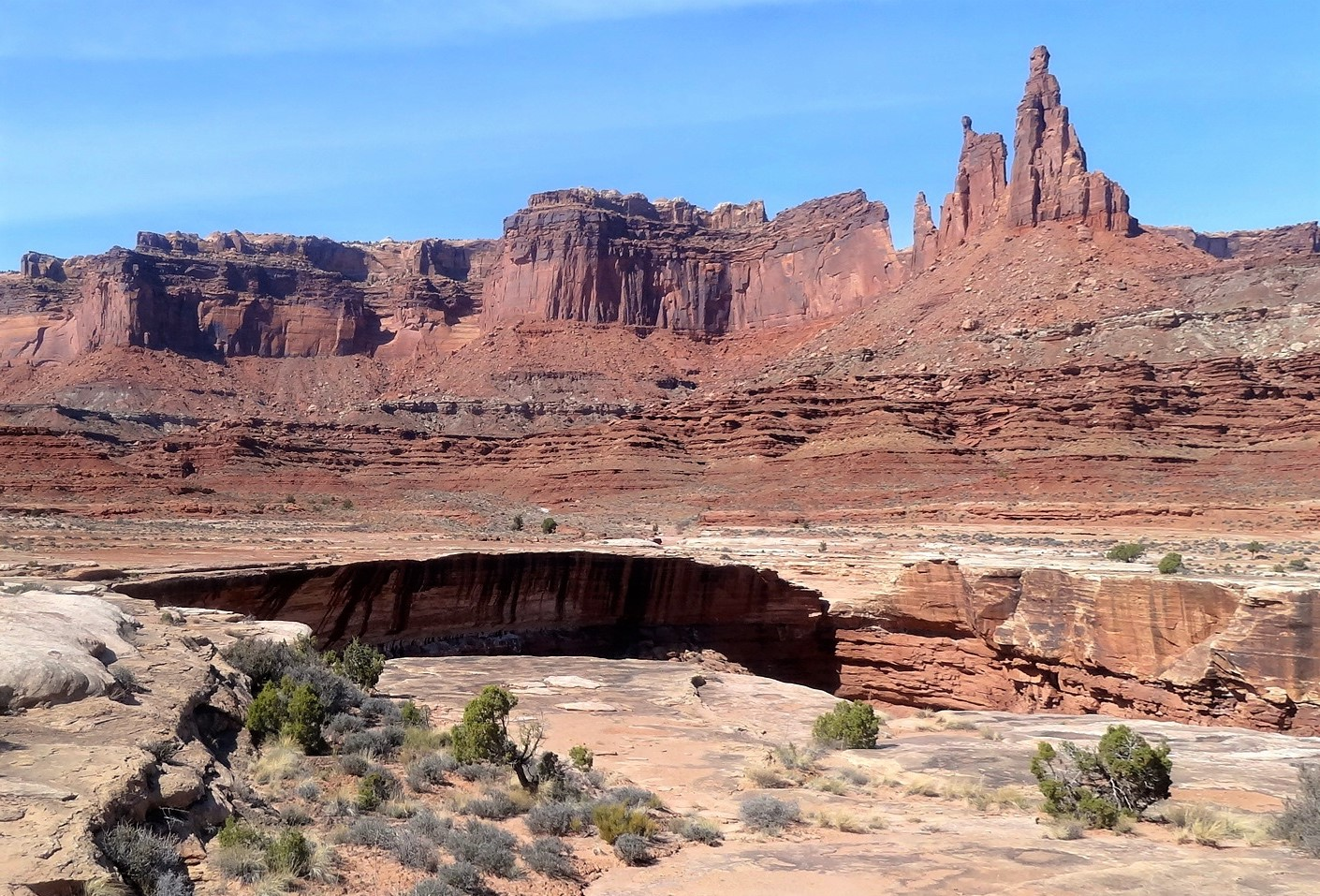
- Monster Tower upper right, south aspect

Highest point
- Elevation: 5,835 ft (1,779 m)
- Prominence: 395 ft (120 m)
- Parent peak: Aztec Butte (6,312 ft)
- Isolation: 3.91 mi (6.29 km)
- Coordinates: 38°23′22″N 109°50′15″W

Geography
- Location within Utah Location within the United States
- Country: United States
- State: Utah
- County: San Juan
- Protected area: Canyonlands National Park
- Parent range: Colorado Plateau
- Topo map: USGS Musselman Arch

Geology
- Rock age: Late Triassic
- Rock type: Wingate Sandstone

Climbing
- First ascent: December 26, 1963
- Easiest route: class 5.11 Climbing

Monster Tower is a 600-foot-tall (180-meter) sandstone tower located on the Island in the Sky District of Canyonlands National Park, in San Juan County, Utah, United States.

== Description ==
The tower is situated 300 feet southeast of Washer Woman, which is a towering arch nearly as high. Washer Woman is so named because the feature gives the appearance of a woman bent over a washtub. Monster and Washer Woman are an eroded fin composed of Wingate Sandstone, which is the remains of wind-borne sand dunes deposited approximately 200 million years ago in the Late Triassic. The nearest higher neighbor is Aztec Butte, 2 mi (3.2 km) to the west-northwest, Airport Tower is set 1.6 mi (2.6 km) to the east, and Mesa Arch is situated 1.5 mi (2.4 km) to the west. A short hike to Mesa Arch provides the easiest view of Monster Tower. Access to the tower is via the four-wheel drive White Rim Road, which is the other way to see Monster. The top of this geological formation rises 1,400 feet above the road in approximately one mile. Precipitation runoff from Monster Tower drains southeast into the nearby Colorado River via Buck Canyon.

== Climbing ==
The first ascent of Monster Tower was made in December 1963 by Layton Kor, Larry Dalke, and Cub Schaefer via the South Ridge (class 5.11). The best route on Monster is the class 5.11a North Ridge, which was first climbed in 1981 by Ken Trout and Kirk Miller. Another alpine route, Monster of Rock (5.11) on the south face, was first climbed in 1982 by Edward Webster and Chester Dreiman. Los Banditos is an aid climb.

== Climate ==
Spring and fall are the most favorable seasons to visit Monster Tower. According to the Köppen climate classification system, it is located in a Cold semi-arid climate zone, which is defined by the coldest month having an average mean temperature below −0 °C (32 °F) and at least 50% of the total annual precipitation being received during the spring and summer. This desert climate receives less than 10 inches (250 millimeters) of annual rainfall, and snowfall is generally light during the winter.

== Gallery ==
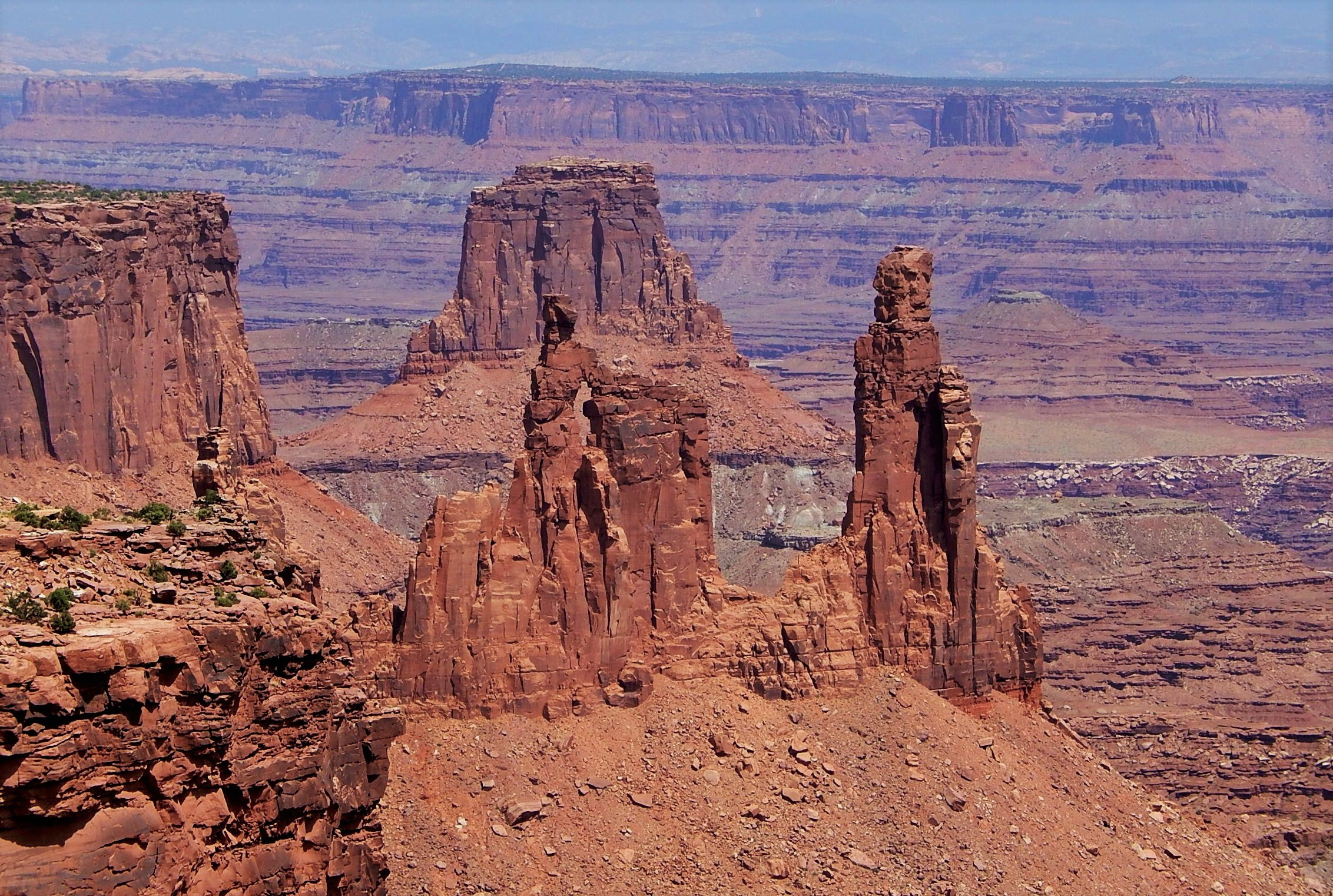
Washer Woman, Monster Tower, and Airport Tower from west.
United Nations Tablet on skyline

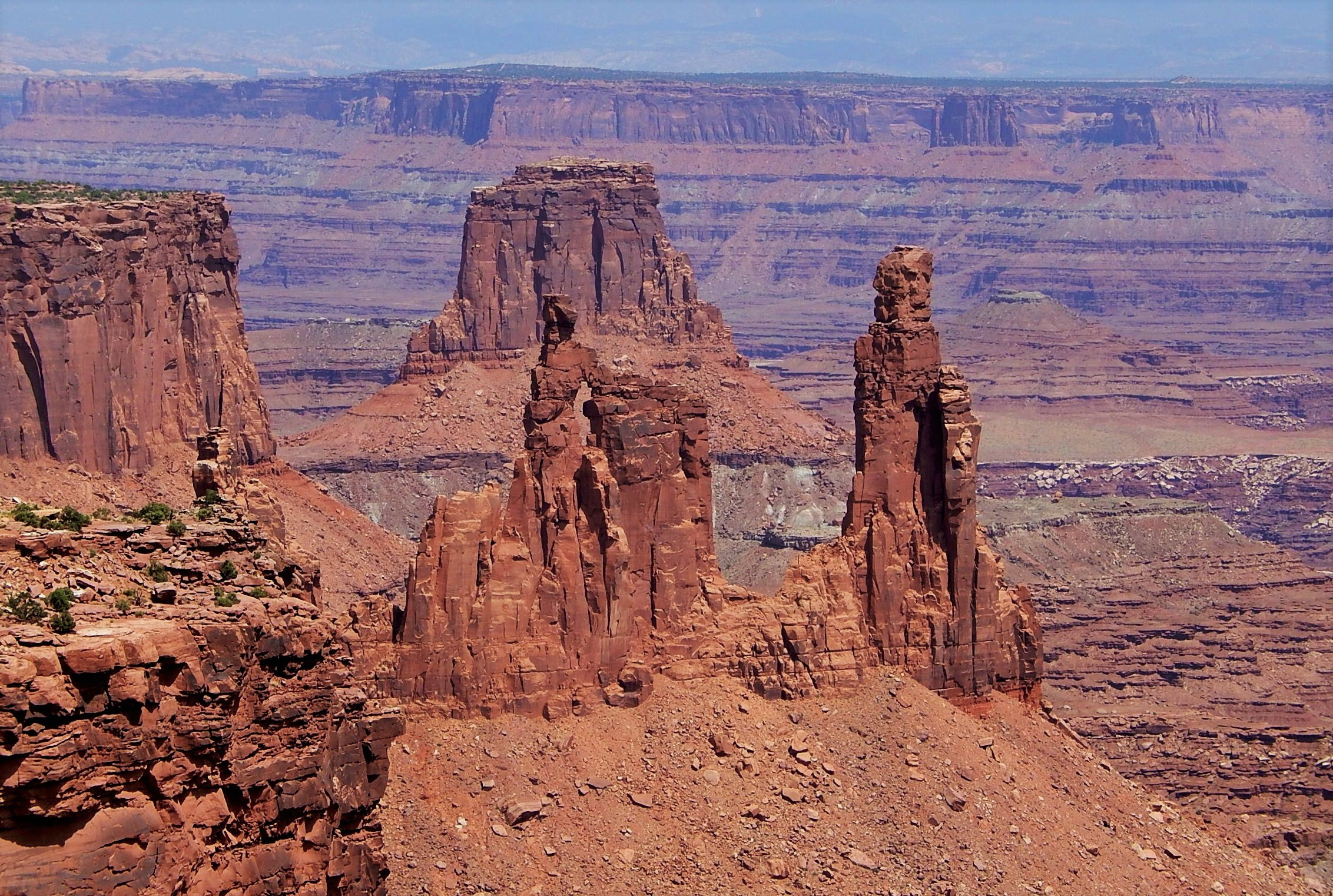

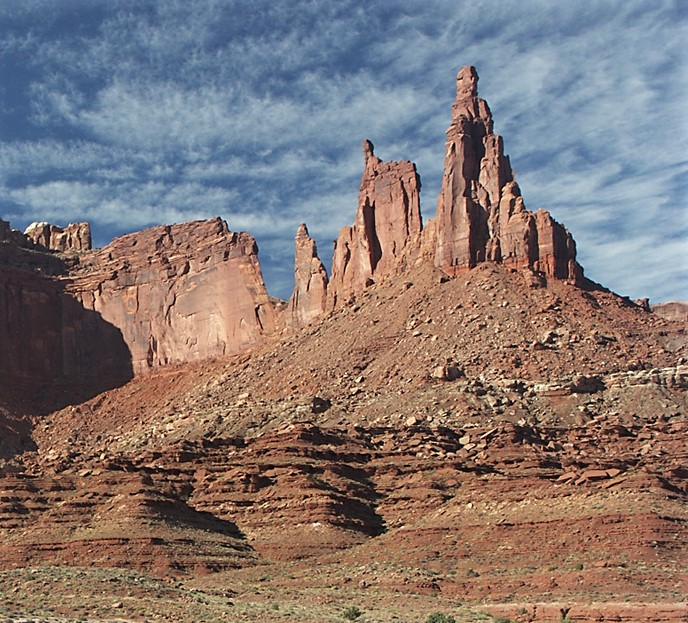
Washer Woman and Monster Tower

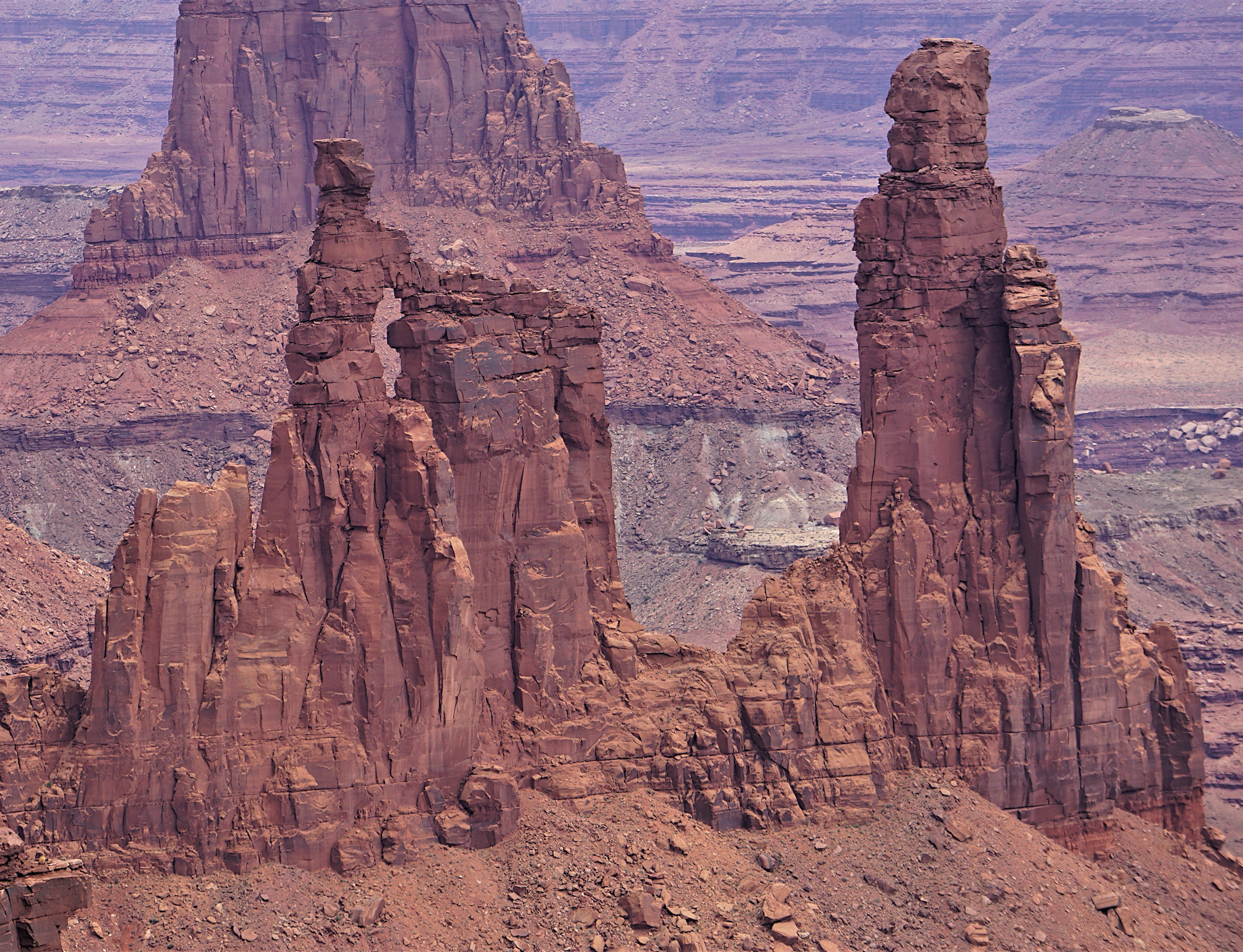
Monster Tower to right

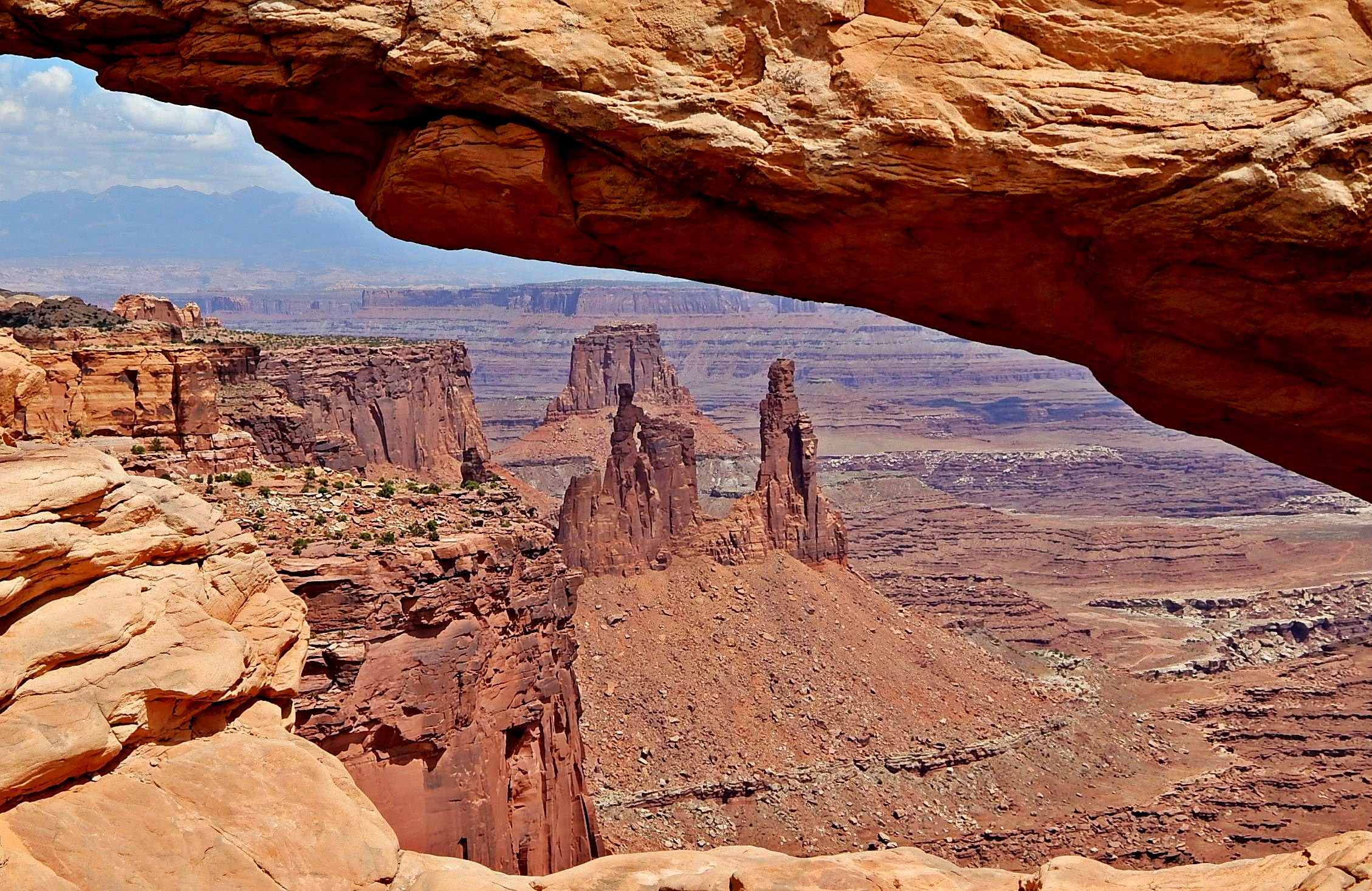
Monster Tower from Mesa Arch

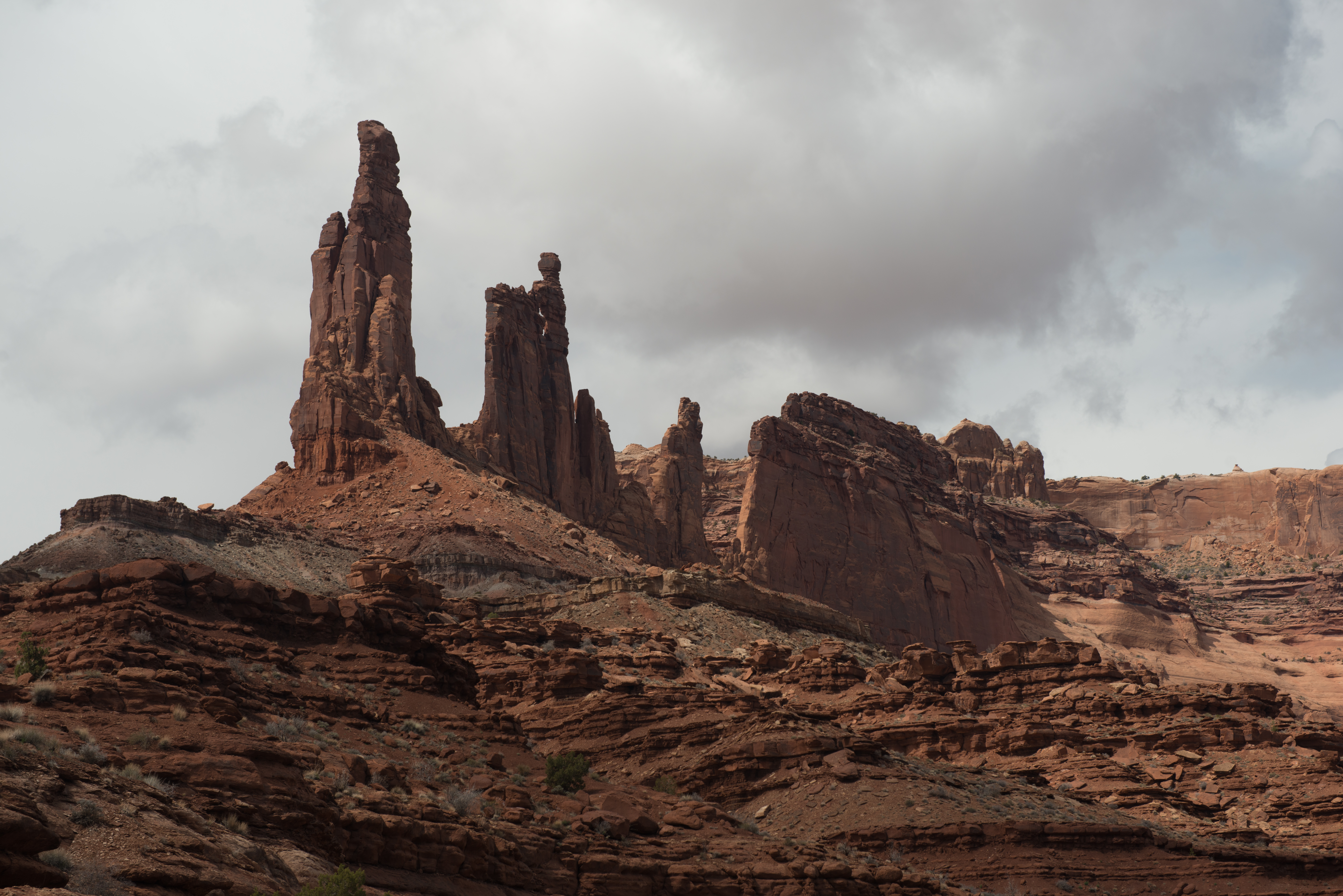
Monster and Washer Woman from ESE at Buck Canyon

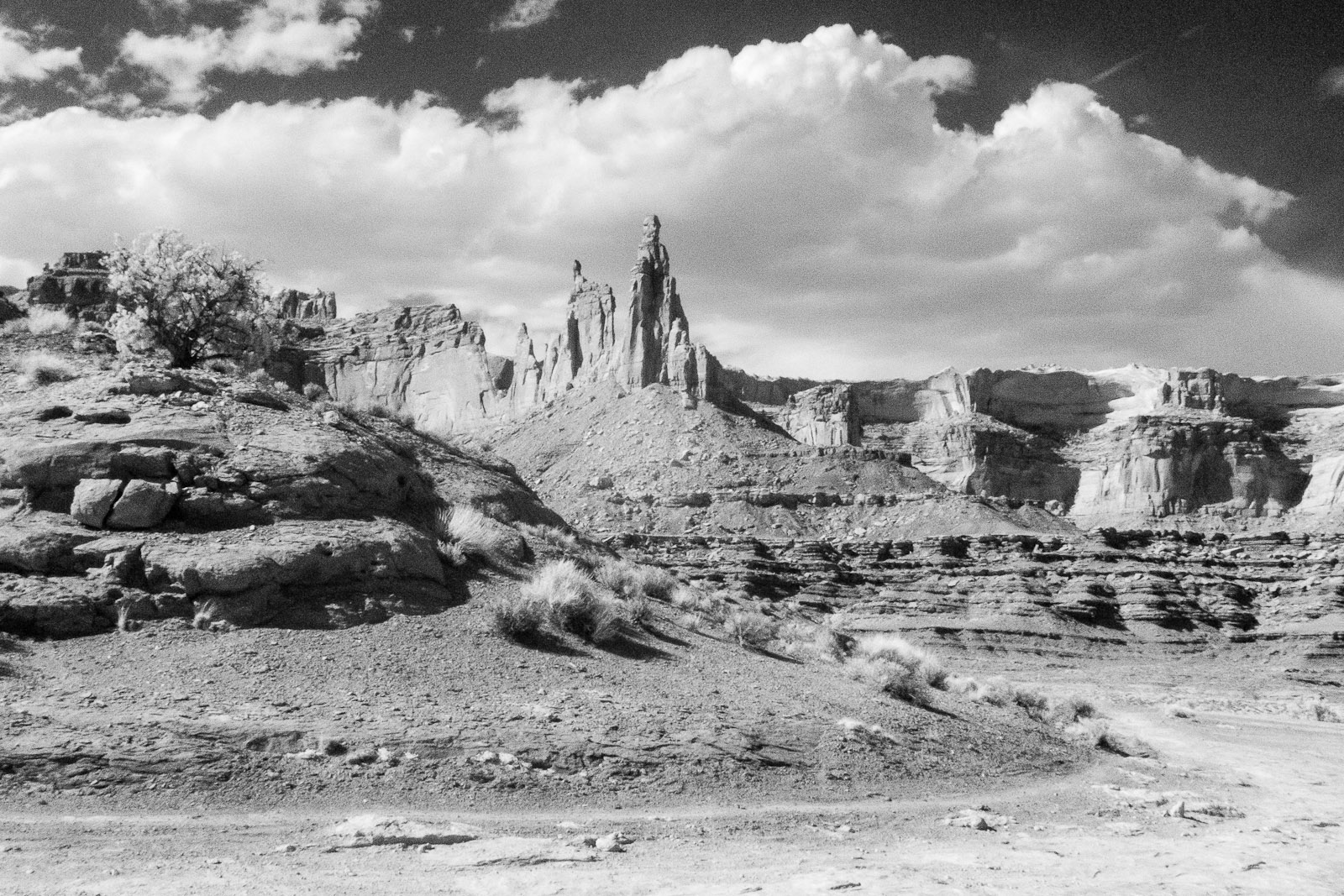

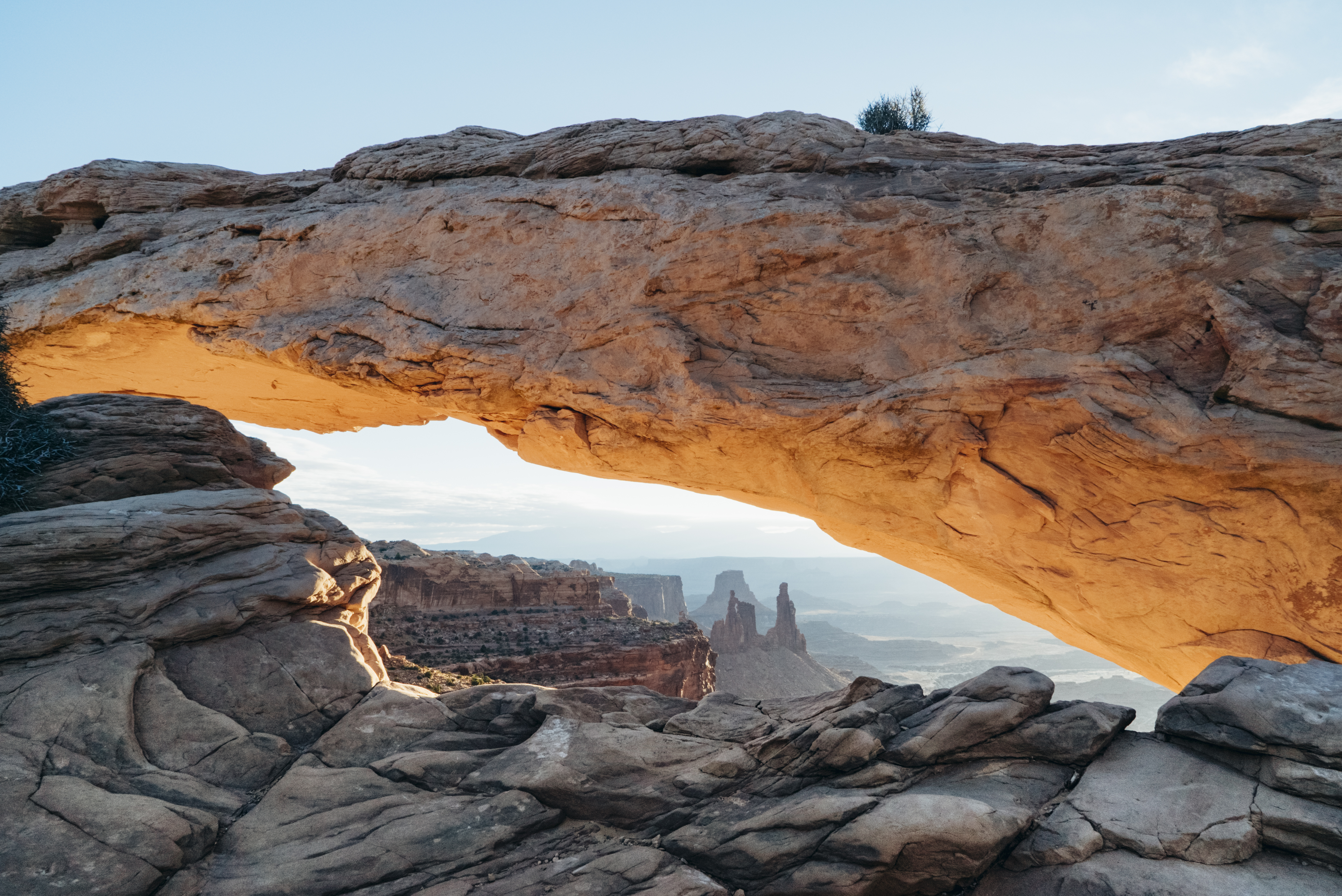
Monster framed by Mesa Arch

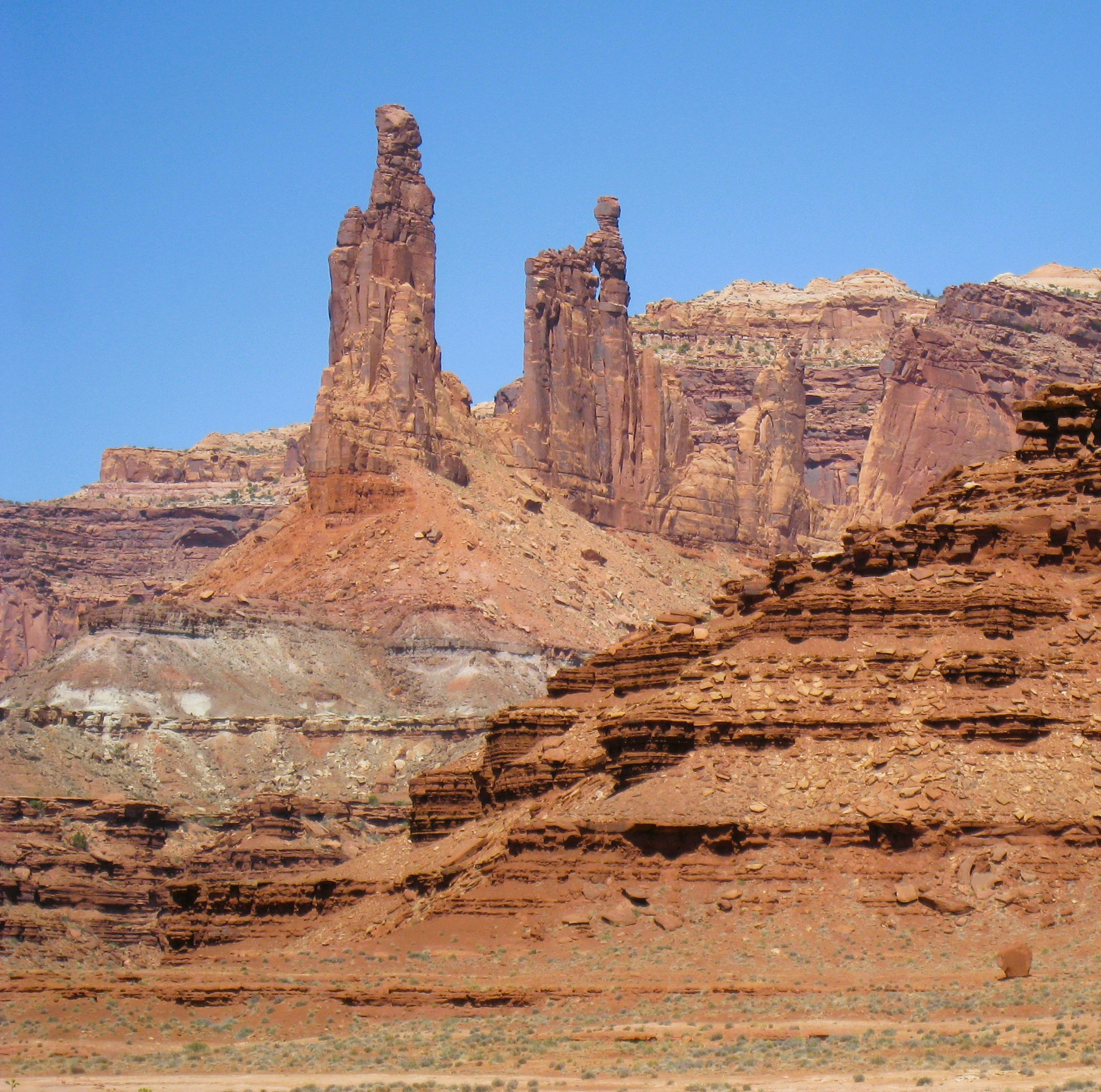
Monster Tower and Washer Woman

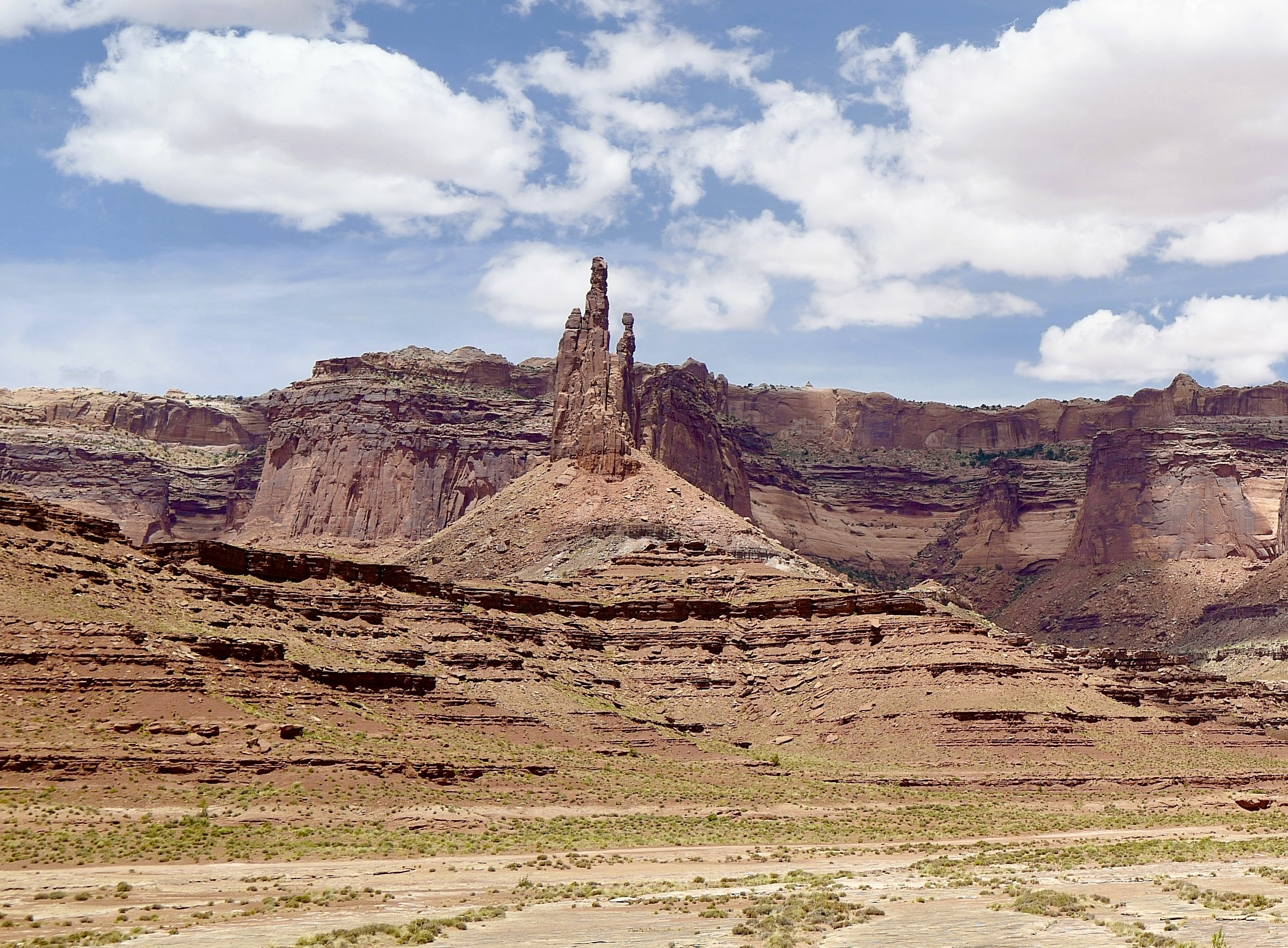
Southeast aspect

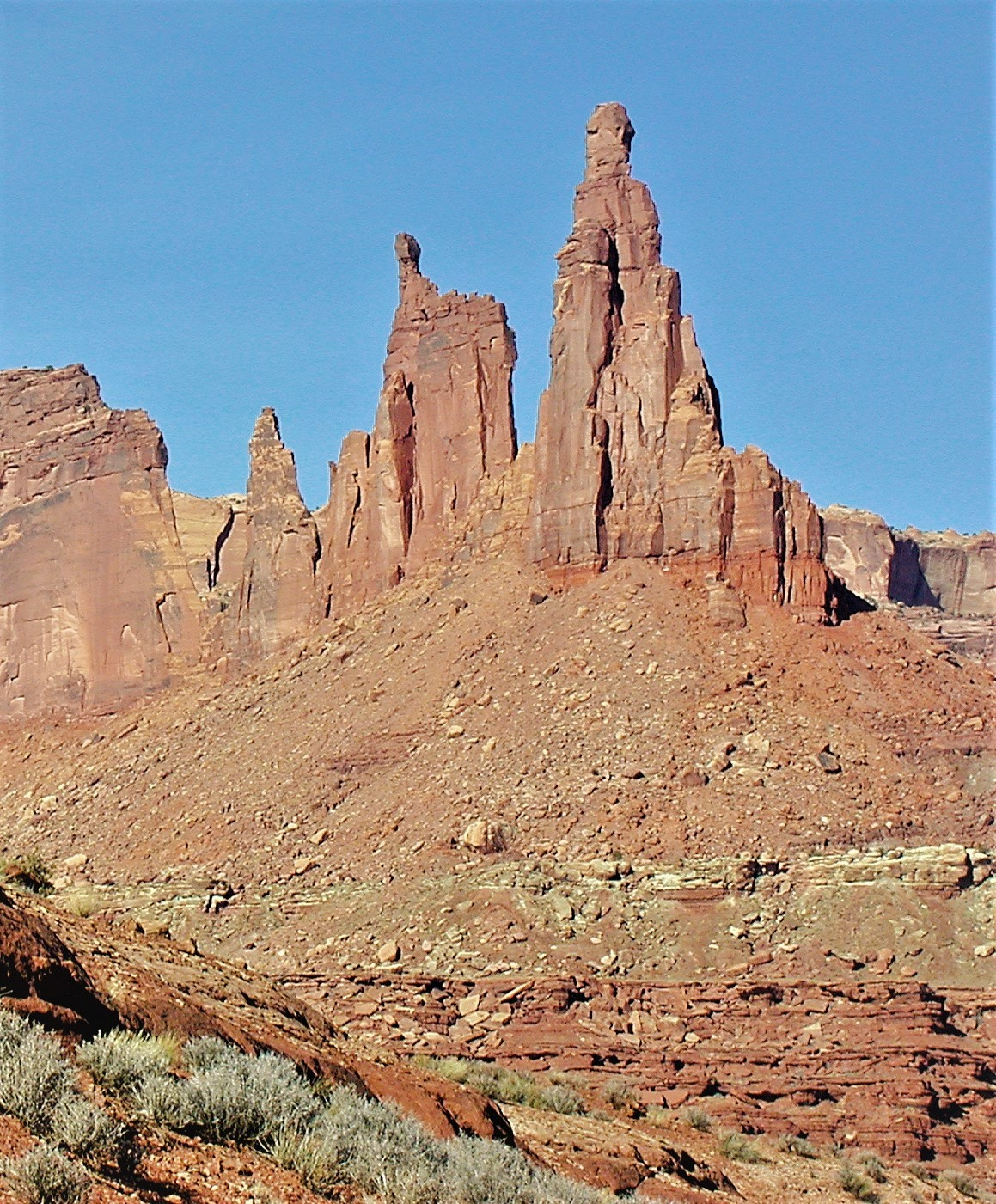

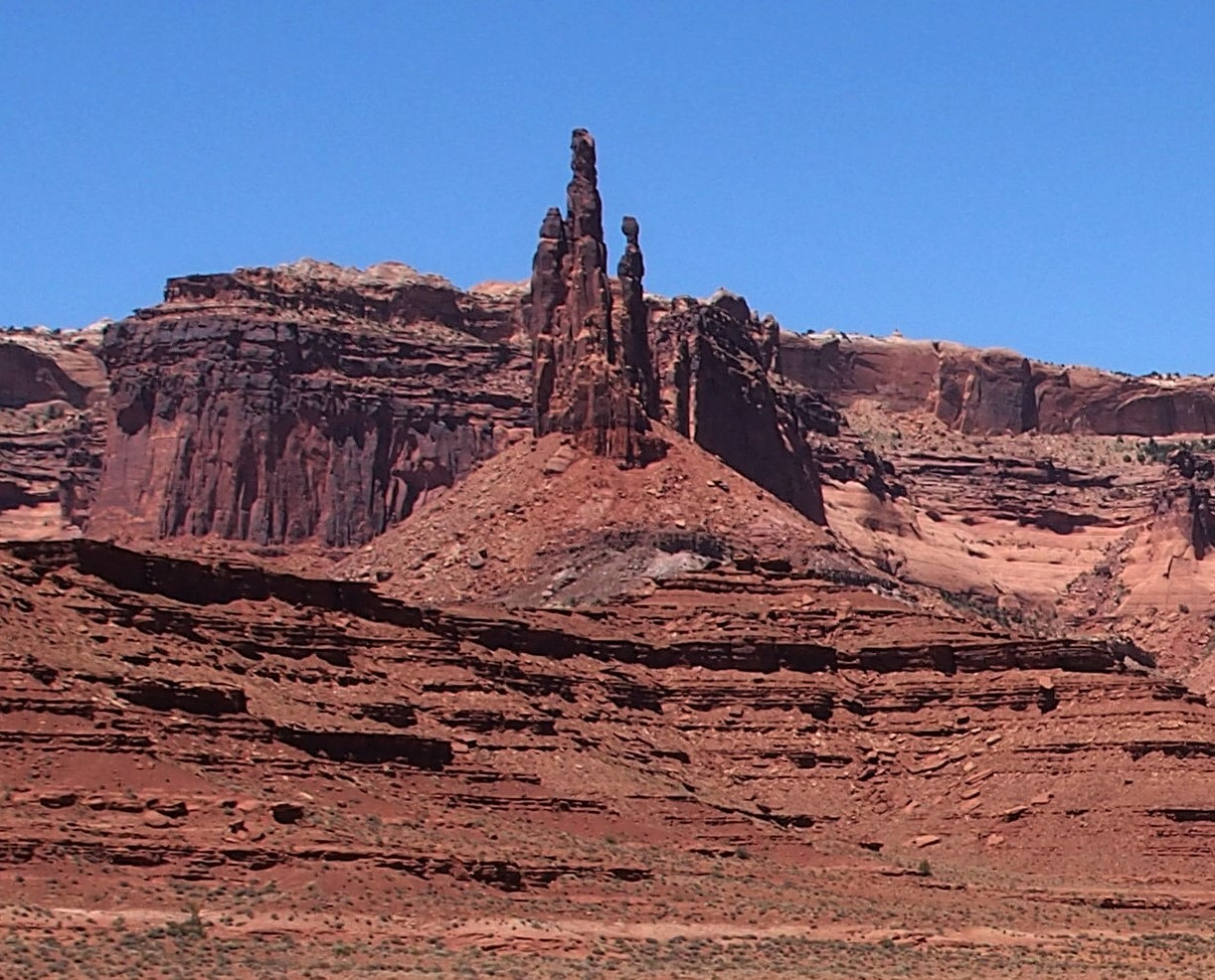

== See also ==
- Colorado Plateau
- Geology of the Canyonlands area
