= Jeep trail =

A jeep trail is the colloquial name for an unpaved route intended primarily for use by high-clearance four-wheel drive (4WD) vehicles. In the United States, the term is commonly used to describe rugged roads and trails that require specialized off-road vehicles and are generally unsuitable for conventional passenger cars.

The term originated from the widespread use of military and civilian Jeep vehicles on difficult off-road routes during the mid-twentieth century. In modern usage, however, the term is generic and does not imply that a trail is restricted to vehicles manufactured by Jeep.

== Notable jeep trails ==
One of the most well-known jeep trails is the Rubicon Trail located west of Lake Tahoe in California. The town of Ouray, Colorado serves as a hub for four-wheel drive excursions through mountain passes such as Engineer Pass and Cinnamon Pass, which together form the Alpine Loop National Back Country Byway as well as Imogene Pass and Black Bear Pass. Moab, Utah hosts the famous Easter Jeep Safari and has numerous trails in the surrounding area, including Hell's Revenge, Pritchett Canyon, Metal Masher, Moab Rim, Cliff Hanger and Poison Spider Mesa. Canyonlands National Park contains several 4WD roads including White Rim Road, Elephant Hill and the Doll House. Other national parks, including Arches, Capitol Reef and Death Valley, have 4WD roads leading to various features within their boundaries.

== See also ==
- Forest track
