= Utah State Route 313 =

Utah state highway in San Juan and Grand Counties

State Route 313
- Dead Horse Point Mesa Scenic Byway
- SR-313 highlighted in red

Route information
- Maintained by UDOT
- Length: 22.506 mi (36.220 km)
- Existed: 1975–present

Major junctions
- West end: Dead Horse Point State Park
- Canyonlands National Park
- East end: US-191 near Moab

Location
- Country: United States
- State: Utah

Highway system
- Utah State Highway System; Interstate; US; State; Minor; Scenic
← SR-312	→ SR-314

State Route 313 (SR-313) is a 22.506-mile-long (36.220 km) state highway in San Juan and Grand Counties in the U.S. State of Utah. The highway has been designated the Dead Horse Point Mesa Scenic Byway. The highway is an access road for both the Island in the Sky district of Canyonlands National Park and Dead Horse Point State Park. The highway is a toll road in Dead Horse Point State Park. Westbound traffic is charged a state park entrance fee at the park boundary.

The route was assigned north of Moab in the 1975 in place of SR-278, a proposed but never constructed access to Dead Horse Point. The original alignment of the highway featured steep grades and blind corners. The highway was completely rebuilt in the 1980s after sustaining damage while crews rebuilt the access road to Canyonlands National Park.

== Route description ==
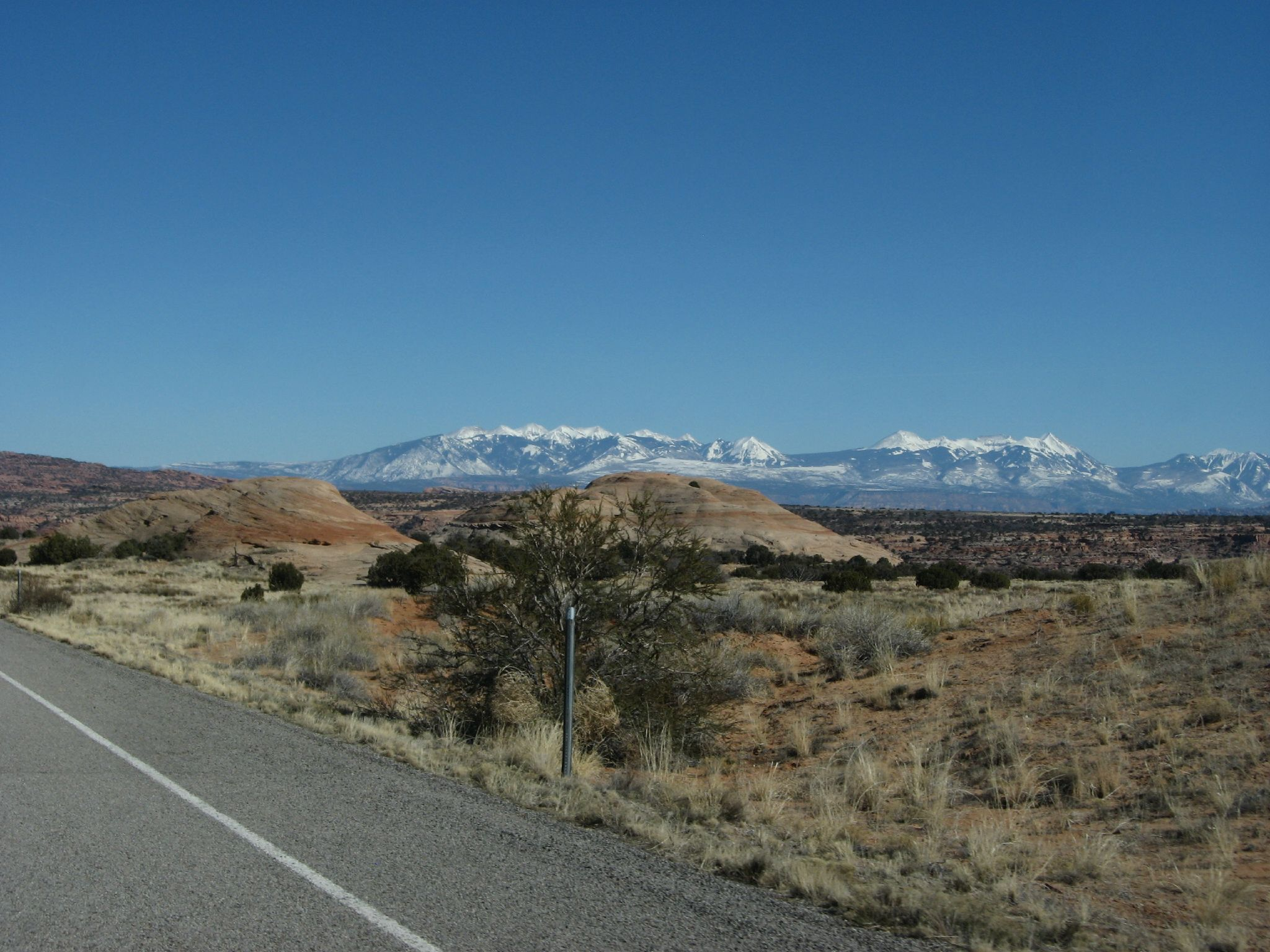
View of La Sal Mountains from SR-313 near Moab

The highway begins at the overlook in Dead Horse Point State Park's parking lot (22 miles south of Moab). Gaining its scenic byway designation, SR-313 heads northward, along the ridges of Dead Horse Point. The highway climbs in elevation, reaching a height of 6,000 feet (1,800 m). Soon after, all drivers exit the park and have to pay a toll. After the high peak at 6,000 feet (1,800 m), SR-313 heads slowly downward, continuing along the ridges in the park. There is an intersection with a local road, and the highway begins to turn to the northwest. The elevation along SR-313 fluctuates for several miles, until intersecting with Long Canyon Road. Long Canyon Road is a connector that heads through Long Canyon and intersects with SR-279. The route continues in a stretch of area known as the Big Flat, where it intersects the entrance to Canyonlands National Park. Soon after the westward turn, SR-313 intersects with Island in the Sky Road, a local road that heads southward from the main highway.

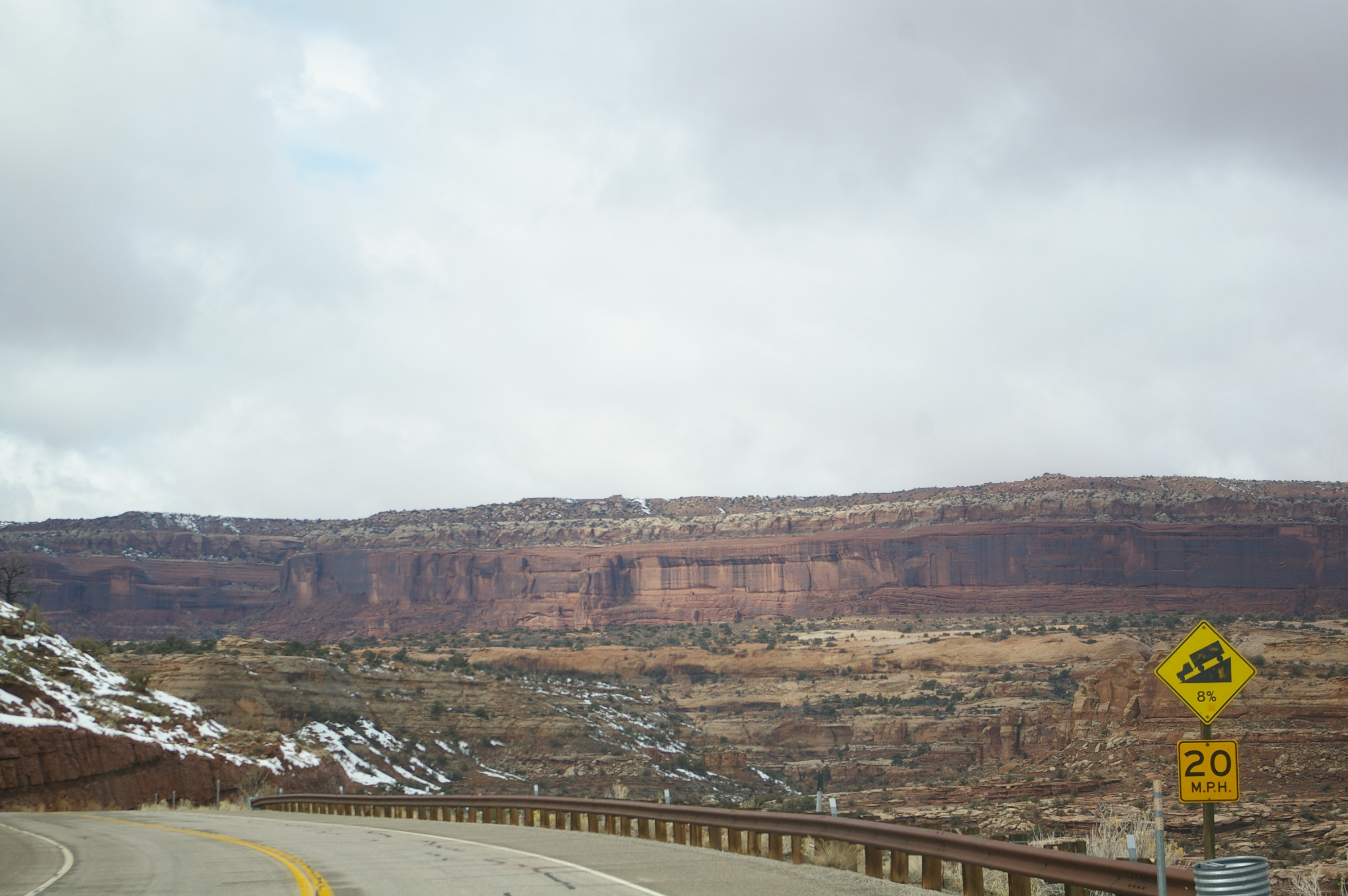
State Route 313 descending into Seven Mile Canyon

The Knoll, a nearby mountain, is visible as the highway makes a turn to the north. The route has left Dead Horse Point State Park by now, and progresses northward through Grand County. At the intersection with Little Canyon Road, SR-313 turns to the northwest once again. However, this pattern straightens out to a northward one. At Gemini Bridges Road, the route turns to the opposite direction, heading to the northwest. The highway continues along in this direction for some time, passing Mineral Bottom Road, and drops down in elevation. The route turns back to the north, and then northeast, until it makes a hairpin turn in the mountains, entering the South Fork of the Sevenmile Canyon. While traversing the canyon there are several view areas along the highway overlooking both Sevenmile canyon, Dead Horse Point, and two rock formations called the Monitor and Merrimac Butte, both named after warships in the American Civil War. Running along the canyon, SR-313 terminates at an intersection with U.S. Route 191 about 9 miles (14 km) north of Moab.

== History ==
With highways in and near Moab back in the 1960s limited to just two state-maintained highways, there was no state route built to access Dead Horse Point. The only two highways in the area were U.S. Route 160 (now U.S. Route 191) and State Route 128. There were two routes assigned in the direction of Dead Horse Point in the 1960s, SR-278 and SR-279. The route that SR-313 runs along was mapped by 1969, stretching all the way to Dead Horse Point as an unmarked county highway. Though SR-279 was completed in 1962, SR-278 was never constructed. In 1975, the proposal for SR-278 was cancelled. In its place, the Utah Department of Transportation assigned SR-313, assuming maintenance for what was local roads.

The original roadbed featured blind switchbacks and an 11% grade on the descent into Seven Mile canyon. The access road to Canyonlands National Park was rebuilt 1988, and the construction crews severely damaged SR-313 in the process. The highway was completely rebuilt, starting in 1989, to its modern form. The reconstruction reduced the maximum grade from 11% to 8% and re-graded the switchbacks to be on level ground to eliminate the blind corners.

== Major intersections ==
County	Location	mi	km	Destinations	Notes
San Juan	Dead Horse Point State Park	0.000	0.000	Parking lot for overlook	Western terminus
San Juan	Dead Horse Point State Park	1.428– 1.460	2.298– 2.350	Visitor Center	
Grand	Dead Horse Point State Park	3.4	5.5	Toll booth	
Grand	Dead Horse Point State Park	3.767	6.062	Park boundary	
Grand		7.960	12.810	To Canyonlands National Park	
Grand		22.506	36.220	US 191 – Moab, Crescent Junction	Eastern terminus
1.000 mi = 1.609 km; 1.000 km = 0.621 mi
