= Dead Horse Point State Park =

State park in Utah, United States

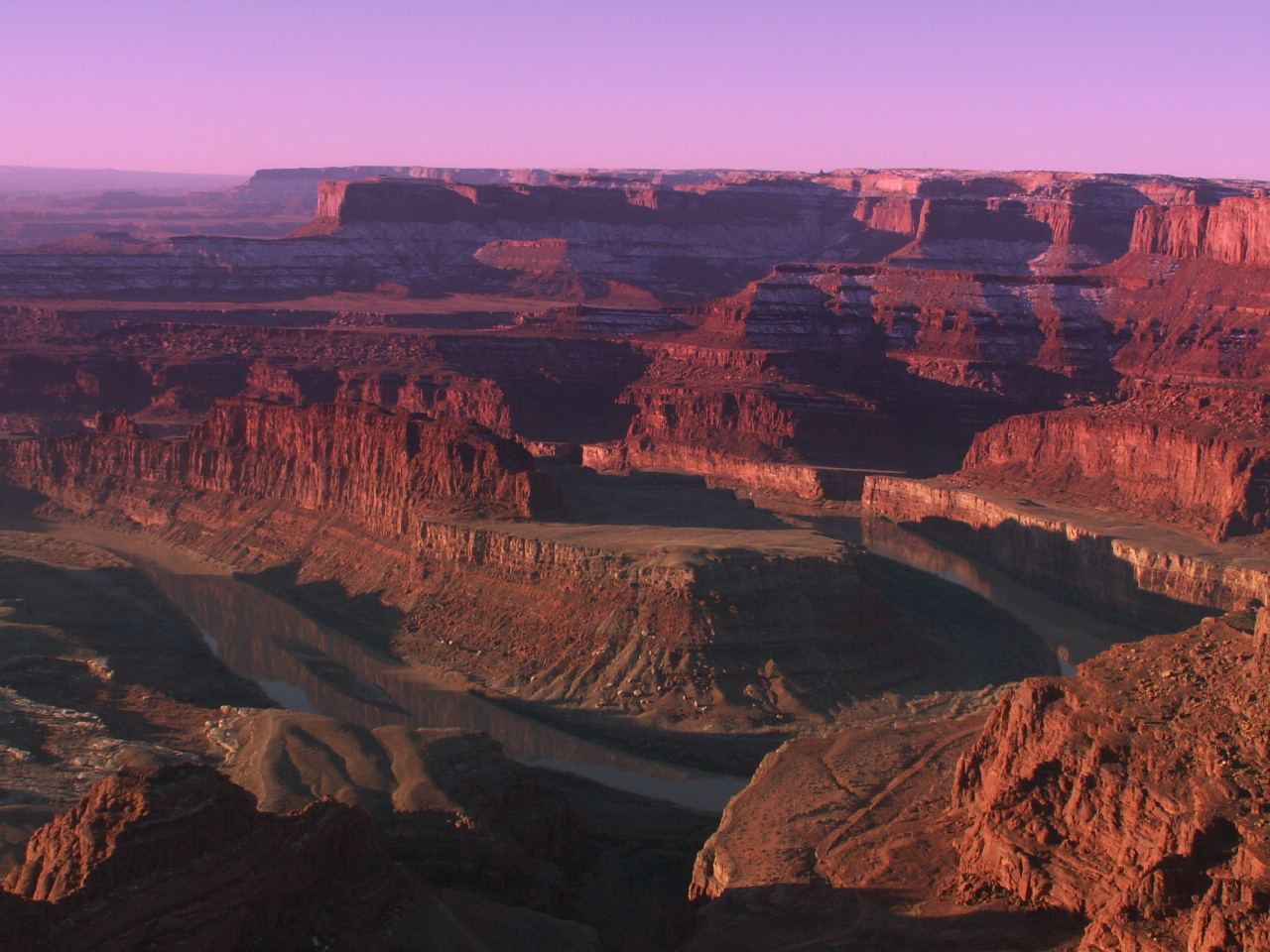
- View of the Colorado River and Canyonlands National Park from Dead Horse Point

- Location within Utah Location within the United States
- Interactive map of Dead Horse Point State Park
- Location: San Juan County, Utah, United States
- Coordinates: 38°30′30″N 109°44′32″W
- Area: 5,300 acres (2,100 ha)
- Elevation: 5,900 ft (1,800 m)
- Opened: 1959
- Operator: Utah State Parks
- Visitors: 1,090,745 (in 2025)
- Website: Official website
- Utah State Parks

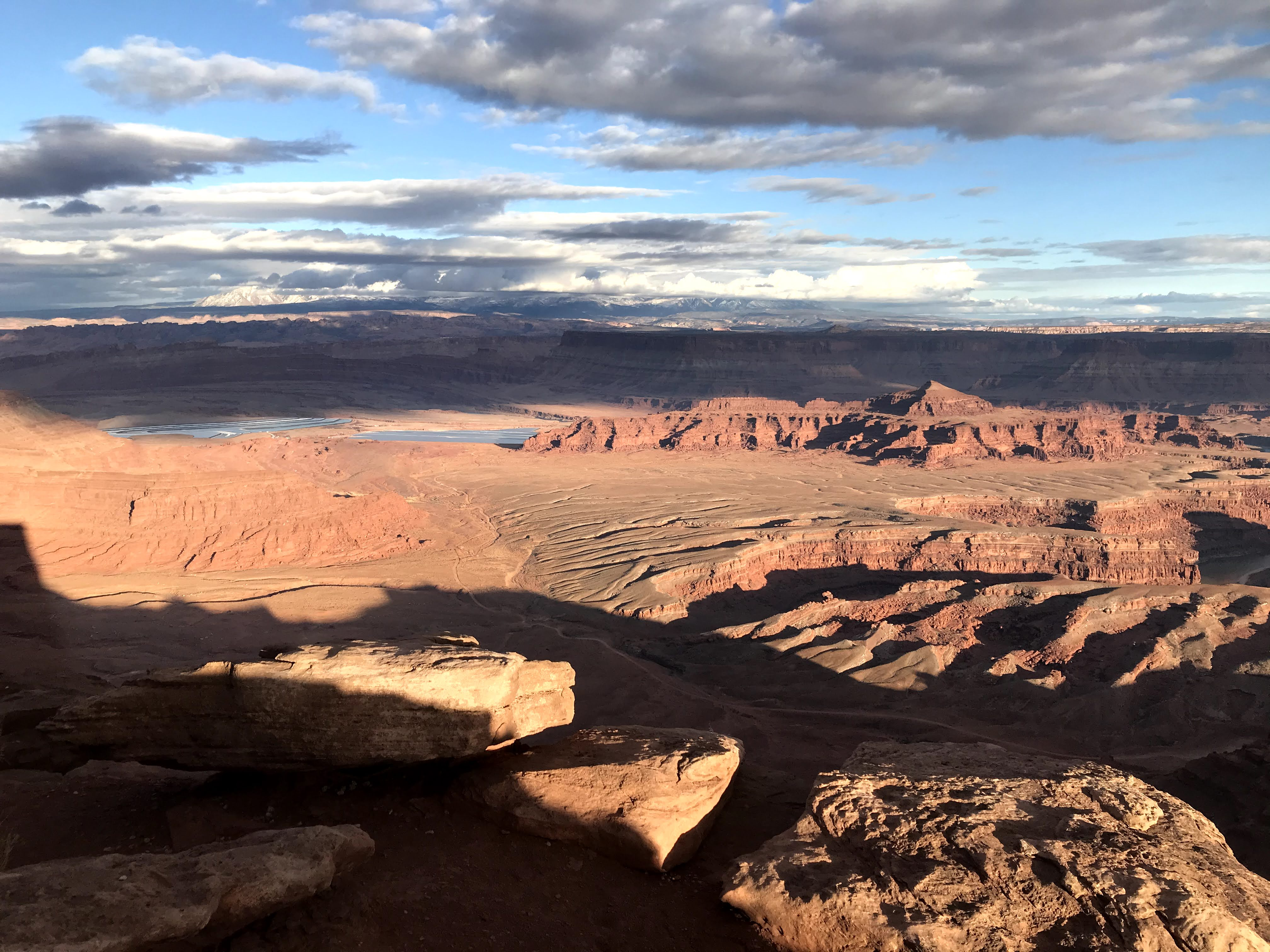
View from Dead Horse Point lookout

Dead Horse Point State Park is a state park in San Juan County, Utah in the United States, featuring a dramatic overlook of the Colorado River and Canyonlands National Park. The park opened to the public in 1959 and covers 5,362 acres (2,170 ha) of high desert at an elevation of 5,900 feet (1,800 m).

== Nature ==
The plants and animals of Dead Horse Point have adapted to a land of scarce water and extreme temperatures.

=== Animals ===
Mule deer, coyote and Hopi chipmunk live in the park.

=== Flora ===
Plants grow slowly due to the extreme conditions and usually have small leaves with a waxy coating to reduce evaporation. Some plants in the park include singleleaf ash, cliffrose, Utah juniper, Mormon tea, blackbrush, claret cup cactus, pinyon pine and narrowleaf yucca.

== Amenities ==
The park has several overlooks, a visitor center, and picnic areas. The Kayenta Campground has 21 RV campsites with electricity and tent pads. The Wingate Campground features 4 yurts, 20 RV campsites and 11 hike-in tent-only sites. There are five additional yurts at the Moenkopi Yurt area. A coffee shop serves food and beverages.

Dead Horse Point State Park features an 8-mile (13 km) hiking trail that includes loops and overlooks on the East Rim Trail and the West Rim Trail. The Intrepid Trail System contains 17 miles of single-track mountain bike trails with loops of varying levels of difficulty. Bikes are also allowed single-file on paved roads.

Hunting is not allowed in the park. Safety concerns include the relative isolation of the park (gas, food and medical care are over 30 miles (48 km) away in Moab), lightning danger and unfenced cliffs.

== Name ==
According to legend, the park is so named because of its use as a natural corral by cowboys in the 19th century, where horses often died of exposure. Dead Horse Point has frequently been noted on lists of unusual place names.

== Film and television ==
- Against a Crooked Sky (1975)
- Choke Canyon (1986)
- Con Air (1997)
- Joe Dirt (2001)
- John Carter (2012)
- MacGyver (1985)
- Mission: Impossible 2 (2000)
- Rio Conchos (1964)
- The Comancheros (1961)
- Touched by an Angel (2001)
- Warlock (1959)
- Westworld (2016)
- Thelma & Louise (1991)

== See also ==
- Utah State Route 313 - Dead Horse Point Mesa Scenic Byway
