= Ekker Butte =

Butte in Glen Canyon National Recreation Area in Wayne Canyon, Utah, United States

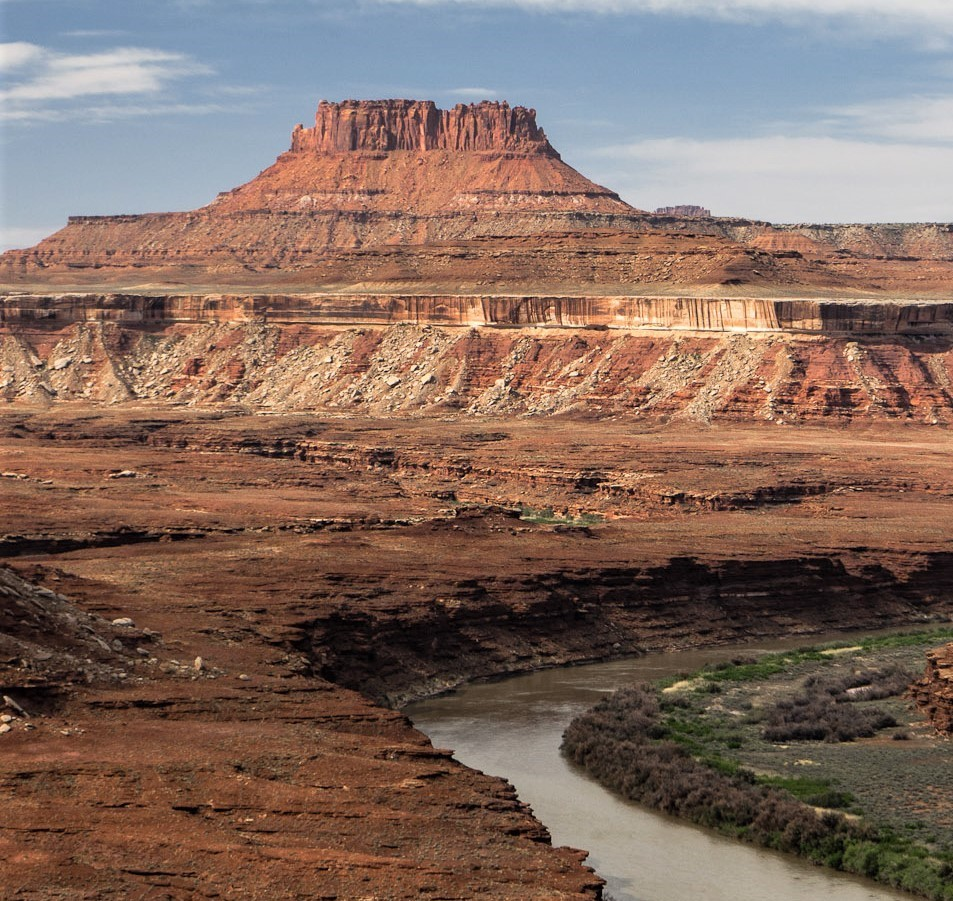
- Ekker Butte and Green River, from NNE

Highest point
- Elevation: 6,260 ft (1,910 m)
- Prominence: 926 ft (282 m)
- Parent peak: Cleopatras Chair (6,520 ft)
- Isolation: 5.34 mi (8.59 km)
- Coordinates: 38°17′12″N 109°59′05″W

Geography
- Location within Utah Location within the United States
- Location: Glen Canyon National Recreation Area; Wayne County, Utah, US
- Parent range: Colorado Plateau
- Topo map: USGS Turks Head

Geology
- Rock age: Late Triassic
- Rock type: Wingate Sandstone

Climbing
- First ascent: 1987
- Easiest route: class 5.x climbing

Ekker Butte is a 6,260-foot (1,910-meter) elevation summit located in the northern reach of Glen Canyon National Recreation Area, in Wayne County of Utah, United States. It is situated seven miles southeast of Buttes of the Cross, six miles northeast of Elaterite Butte, and less than two miles outside the boundary of Canyonlands National Park, where it towers over 1,400 feet (430 meters) above the surrounding terrain. Distant views of this remote butte can be seen from the Grand View Point and Green River Overlooks at Island in the Sky of Canyonlands National Park. This geological landmark is named for the pioneering Art Ekker family which operated the nearby Robbers Roost Ranch and grazed cattle on land adjacent to the nearby Maze. Arthur Benjamin Ekker (1911–1978) took Robert Redford on a tour of nearby Robbers Roost, the hideout of outlaw Butch Cassidy and the Wild Bunch.

== Geology ==
Ekker Butte is composed of hard, fine-grained Wingate Sandstone, which is the remains of wind-borne sand dunes deposited approximately 200 million years ago in the Late Triassic. This Wingate sandstone, capped by Kayenta Formation, forms steep cliffs as it overlays softer layers of the Chinle Formation, which is exposed down to a prominent ledge formed by the Moss Back Member. Slopes below this ledge are Moenkopi Formation, down to the White Rim. Precipitation runoff drains into the nearby Green River, which in turn is part of the Colorado River drainage basin.

== Climbing ==
The first ascent of Ekker Butte was made in January 1987, by Tom Thomas and Dan Mathews via the class 5.11 South Tower.

== Climate ==
Spring and fall are the most favorable seasons to visit Ekker Butte. According to the Köppen climate classification system, it is located in a Cold semi-arid climate zone, which is defined by the coldest month having an average mean temperature below 32 °F (0 °C), and at least 50% of the total annual precipitation being received during the spring and summer. This desert climate receives less than 10 inches (250 millimeters) of annual rainfall, and snowfall is generally light during the winter.

== See also ==
- Geology of the Canyonlands area
- Colorado Plateau

== Gallery ==
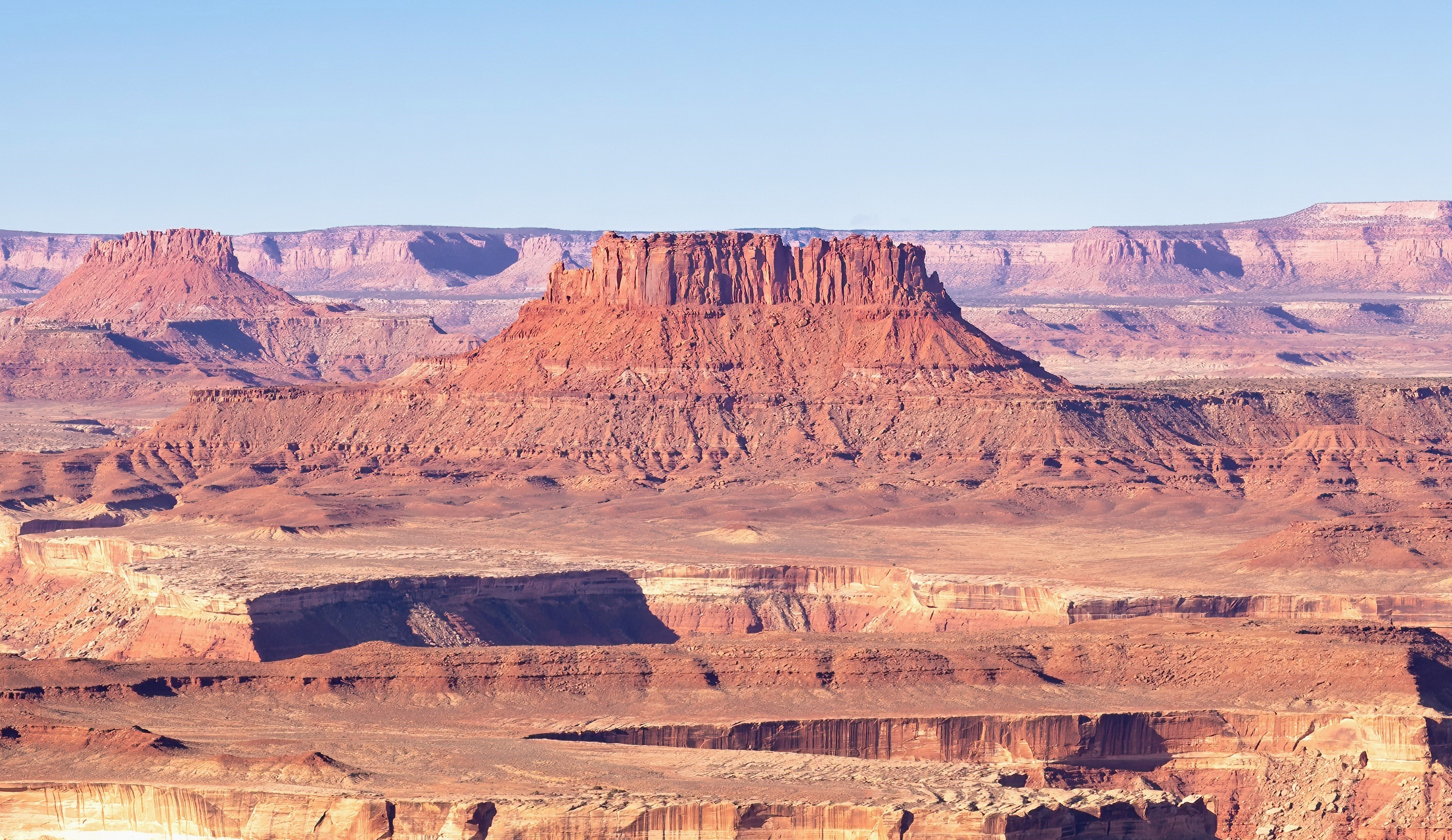
Ekker Butte from Green River Overlook
(Elaterite Butte to left)

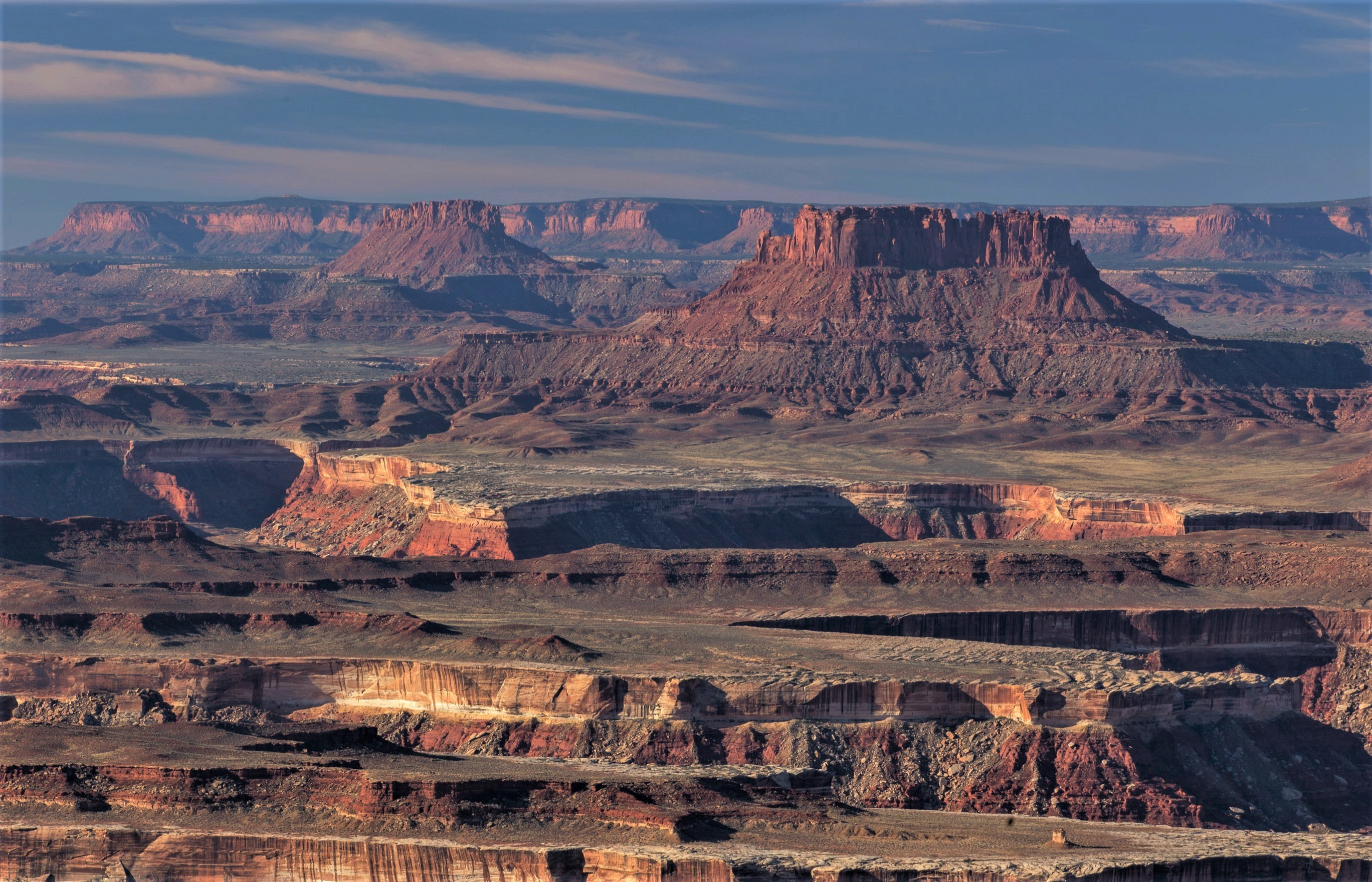
Ekker Butte (right) from Green River Overlook in Canyonlands National Park
(Elaterite Butte to left)

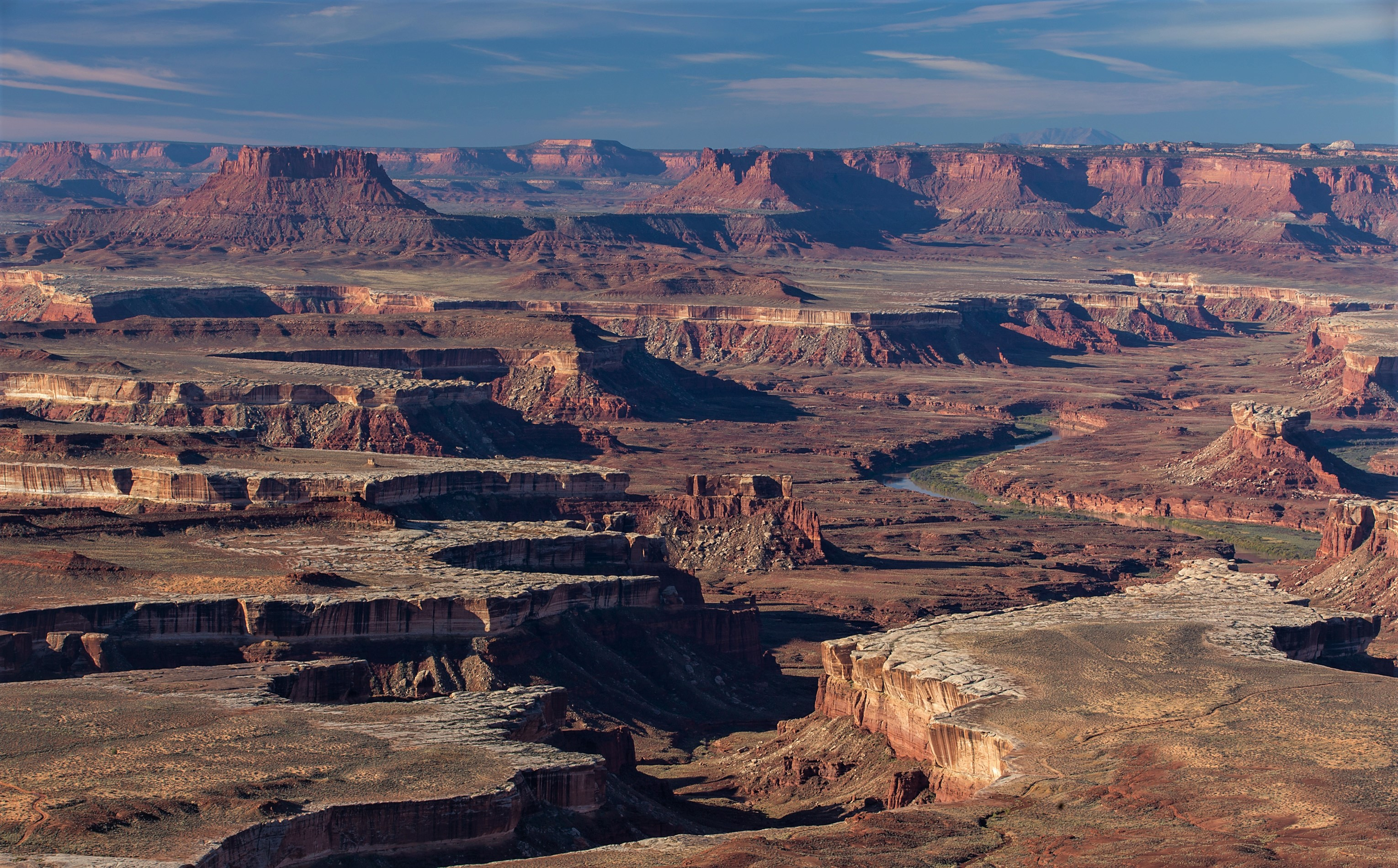
Ekker Butte (upper left), from Green River Overlook
