= Elaterite Butte =

Butte in Utah, United States

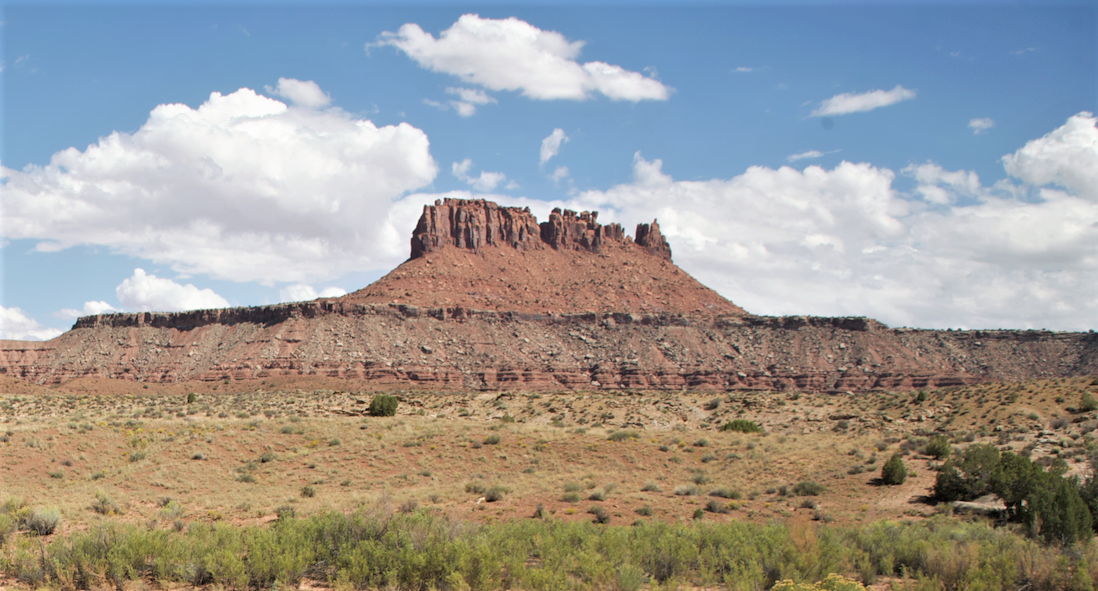
- Elaterite Butte, west aspect from Elaterite Basin

Highest point
- Elevation: 6,552 ft (1,997 m)
- Prominence: 752 ft (229 m)
- Parent peak: Lands End (7,151 ft)
- Isolation: 4.88 mi (7.85 km)
- Coordinates: 38°13′01″N 110°02′15″W

Geography
- Location within Utah Location within the United States
- Country: United States
- State: Utah
- County: Wayne
- Protected area: Canyonlands National Park
- Parent range: Colorado Plateau
- Topo map: USGS Elaterite Basin

Geology
- Rock age: Late Triassic
- Rock type: Wingate Sandstone

Climbing
- Easiest route: class 5.x climbing

Elaterite Butte is a 6,552-foot (1,997-meter) elevation summit located in The Maze District of Canyonlands National Park, in Wayne County, Utah. Elaterite Butte is situated 6 mi (9.7 km) southwest of Ekker Butte, and the Maze Overlook is situated 2.5 mi (4.0 km) to the northeast. Elaterite Butte is composed of hard, fine-grained Wingate Sandstone, which is the remains of wind-borne sand dunes deposited approximately 200 million years ago in the Late Triassic. This Wingate sandstone overlays a 432-foot thick layer of the softer Chinle Formation. The top of this geological formation rises over 1,400 feet above Elaterite Basin. The butte and basin are named for elaterite, which is a dark brown, tar-like, elastic mineral resin that seeps from parts of the nearby White Rim Sandstone. Access to the remote butte is via a four-wheel drive road in Elaterite Basin. Precipitation runoff from Elaterite Butte drains into the nearby Green River, which in turn is within the Colorado River drainage basin.

== Climate ==
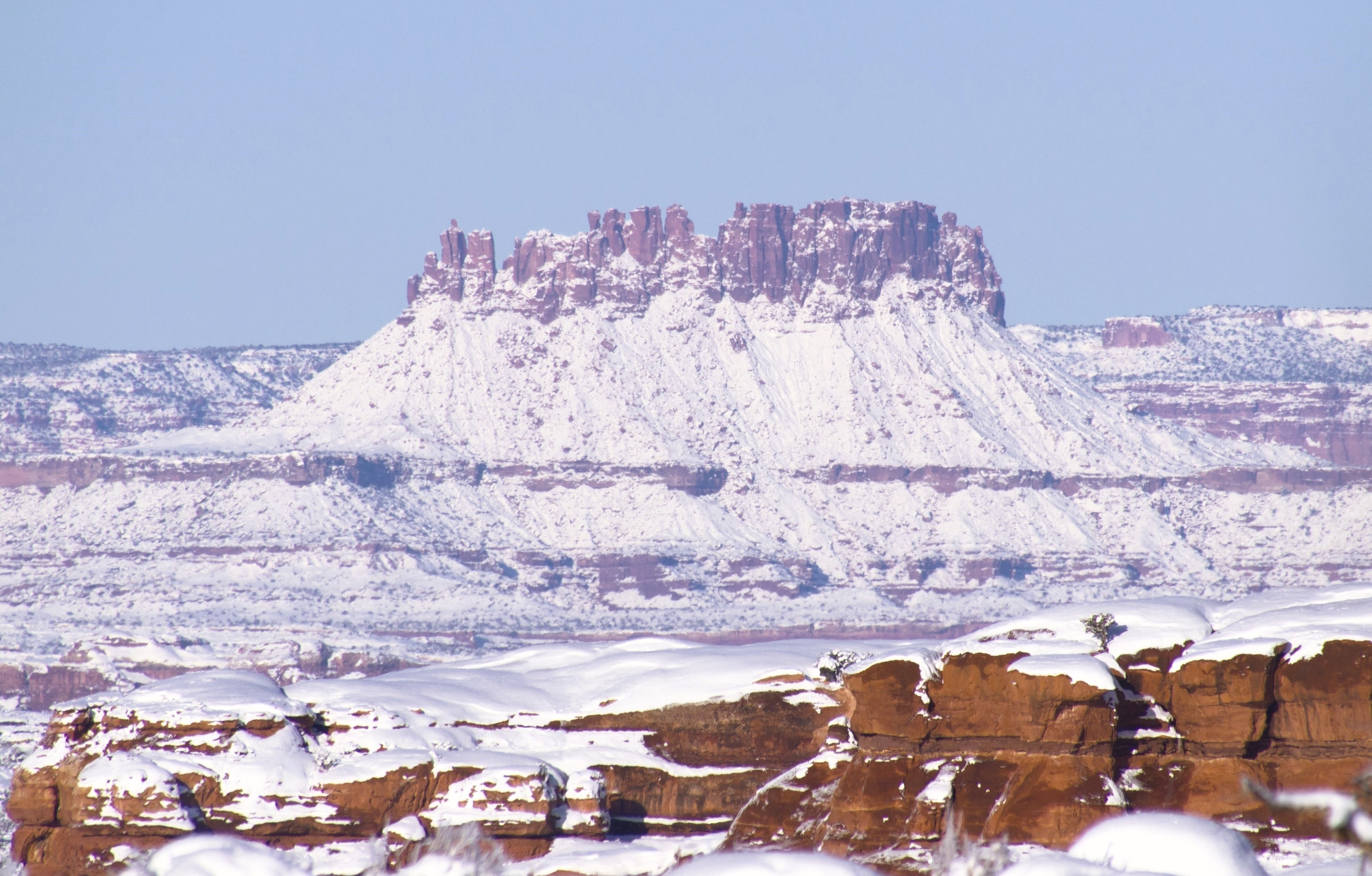
Elaterite Butte in winter

Spring and fall are the most favorable seasons to visit Elaterite Butte. According to the Köppen climate classification system, it is located in a Cold semi-arid climate zone, which is defined by the coldest month having an average mean temperature below −0 °C (32 °F) and at least 50% of the total annual precipitation being received during the spring and summer. This desert climate receives less than 10 inches (250 millimetres) of annual rainfall, and snowfall is generally light during the winter.

== See also ==
- Colorado Plateau
- Geology of the Canyonlands area
