= Candlestick Tower =

Rock formation in Utah, United States

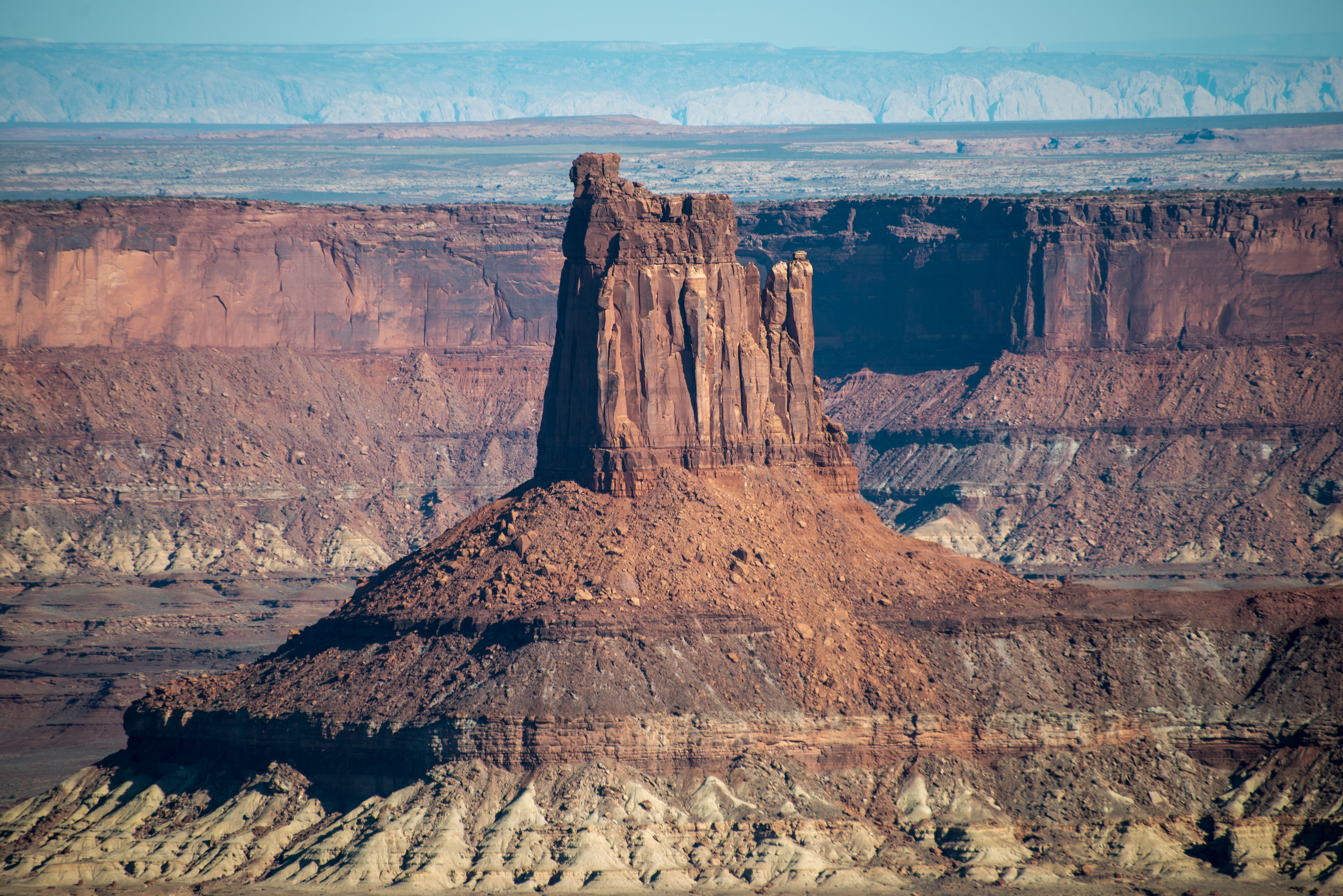
- Candlestick Tower from the southeast

Highest point
- Elevation: 5,867 ft (1,788 m)
- Prominence: 707 ft (215 m)
- Parent peak: Shaft Benchmark (6,329 ft)
- Isolation: 0.93 mi (1.50 km)
- Coordinates: 38°22′51″N 109°55′54″W

Geography
- Location within Utah Location within the United States
- Country: United States
- State: Utah
- County: San Juan
- Protected area: Canyonlands National Park
- Parent range: Colorado Plateau
- Topo map: USGS Upheaval Dome

Geology
- Rock age: Late Triassic
- Rock type: Wingate Sandstone

Climbing
- First ascent: 1974
- Easiest route: class 5.10 Climbing

Candlestick Tower is a 450-foot-tall (140 m) sandstone butte located in the Island in the Sky District of Canyonlands National Park, in San Juan County, Utah. Its descriptive name comes from its resemblance to a candlestick. Candlestick Tower is composed of Wingate Sandstone, which is the remains of wind-borne sand dunes deposited approximately 200 million years ago in the Late Triassic.

The nearest higher neighbor is Shaft Benchmark, 2 mi (3.2 km) to the east; Upheaval Dome is located 3 mi (4.8 km) to the north and the Green River Overlook is situated 2.5 mi (4.0 km) to the east. Access to the tower is via the four-wheel-drive White Rim Road. Candlestick is situated north of Soda Springs Basin and south of Holeman Spring Basin, and the top of this geological formation rises 1,400 feet above the White Rim Road in approximately one mile. Precipitation runoff from Candlestick Tower drains into the nearby Green River via these two basins.

== Climbing ==
The first ascent of Candlestick was made in March 1974 by Jimmy Dunn, Larry Hamilton, Doug Snively, and John Byrd. The first free ascent of Candlestick Tower was made by Glenn Randall and Kent Lugbill in 1982. The established routes on Candlestick are the class 5.10 Southwest Corner, the East Face (5.10), and Two Worlds Route is an aid climb.

== Climate ==
Spring and fall are the most favorable seasons to visit Candlestick Tower. According to the Köppen climate classification system, it is located in a Cold semi-arid climate zone, which is defined by the coldest month having an average mean temperature below −0 °C (32 °F) and at least 50% of the total annual precipitation being received during the spring and summer. This desert climate receives less than 10 inches (250 millimetres) of annual rainfall, and snowfall is generally light during the winter.

== Gallery ==
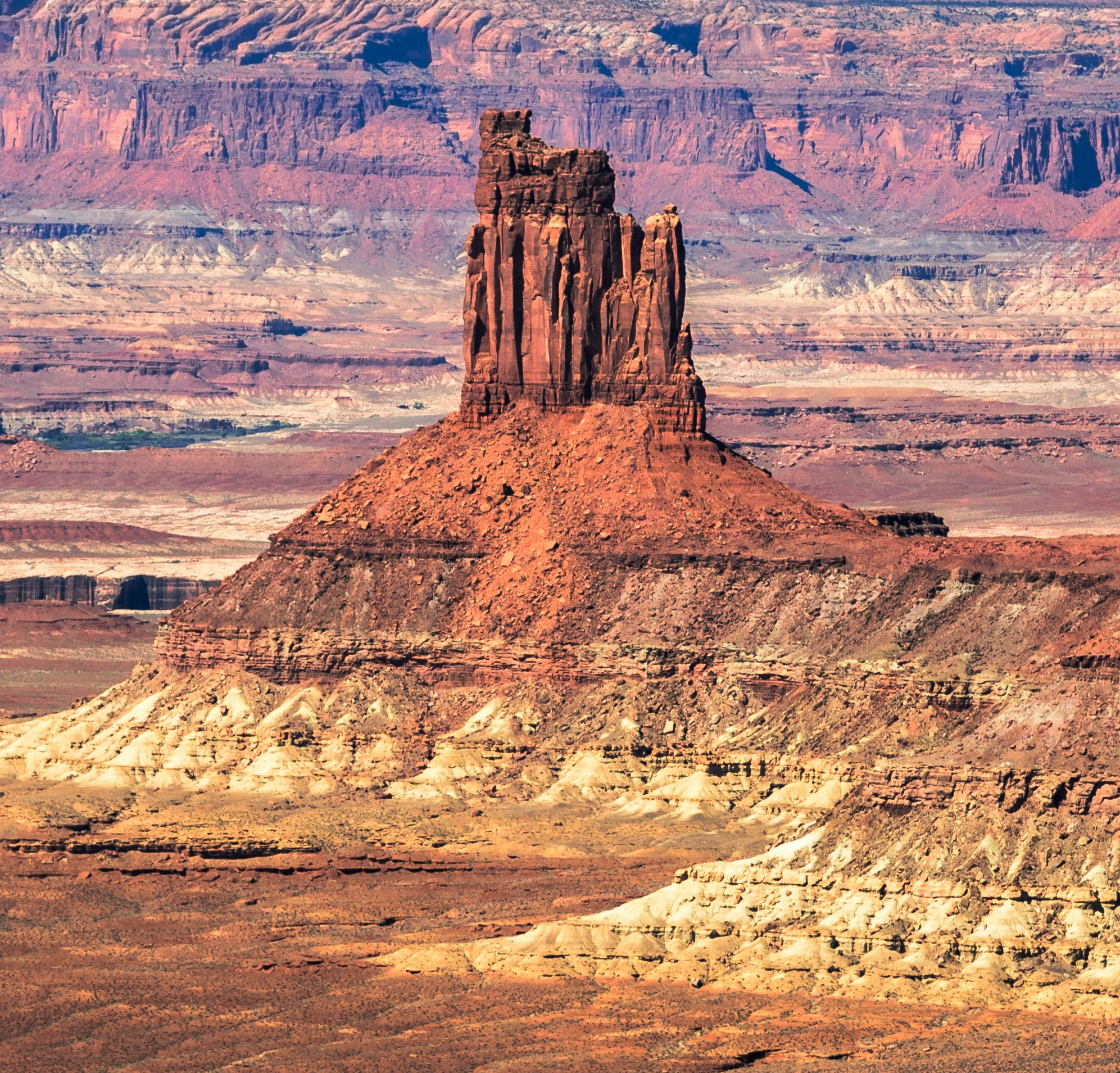
East aspect

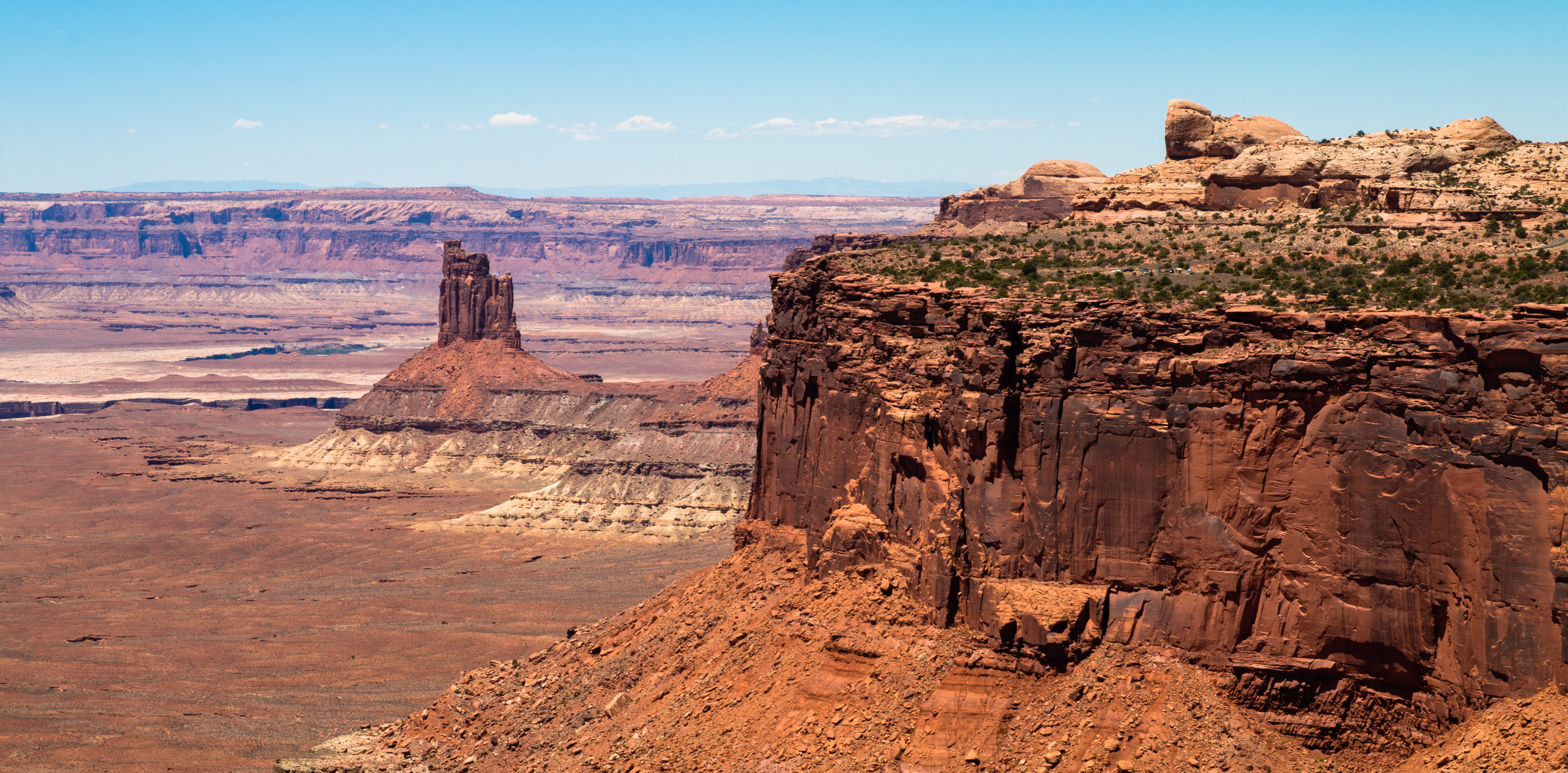
Candlestick Tower (left), Shaft Benchmark and Green River Overlook (right), seen from the east

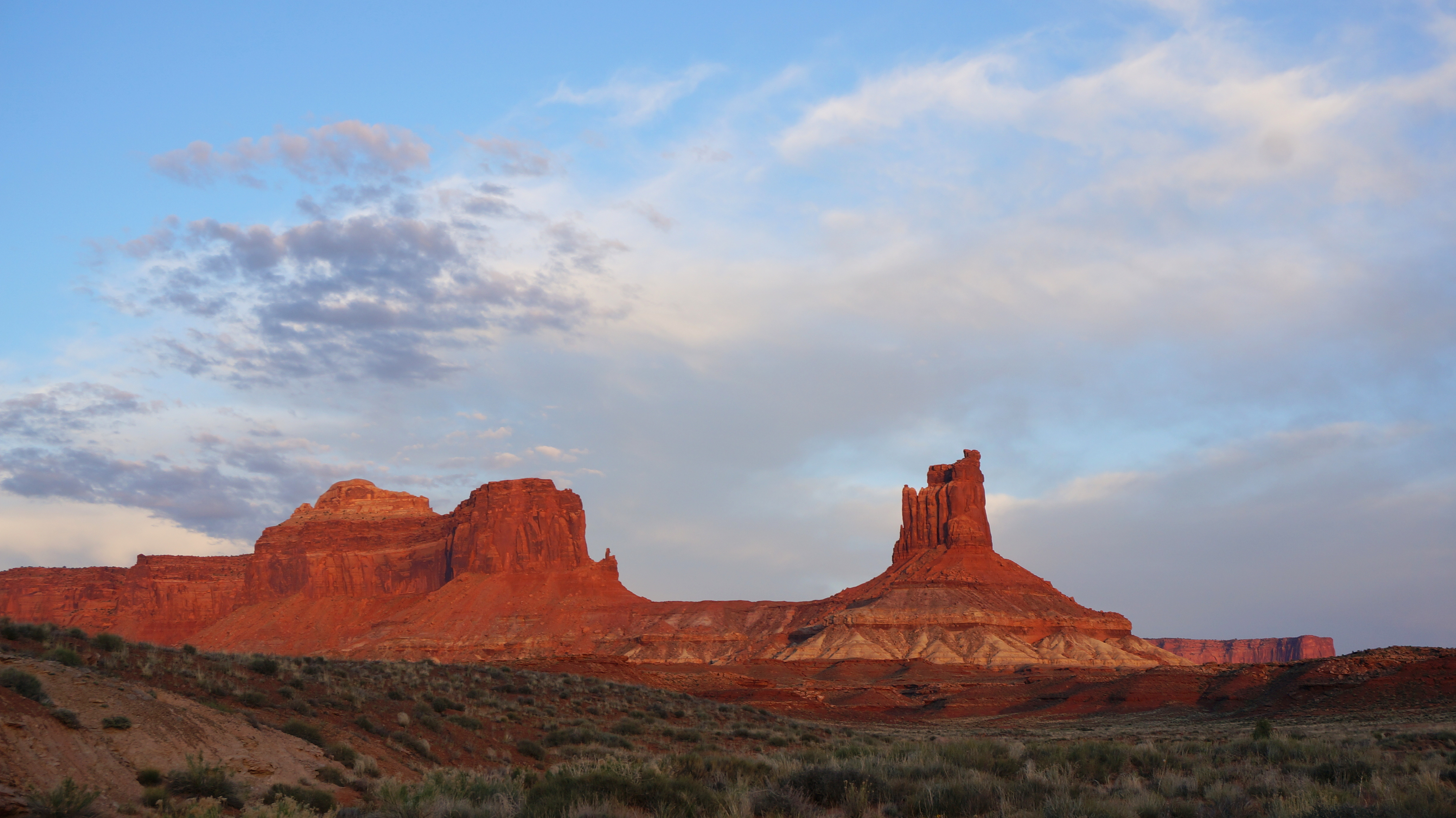
Candlestick Tower from Holeman Spring Basin

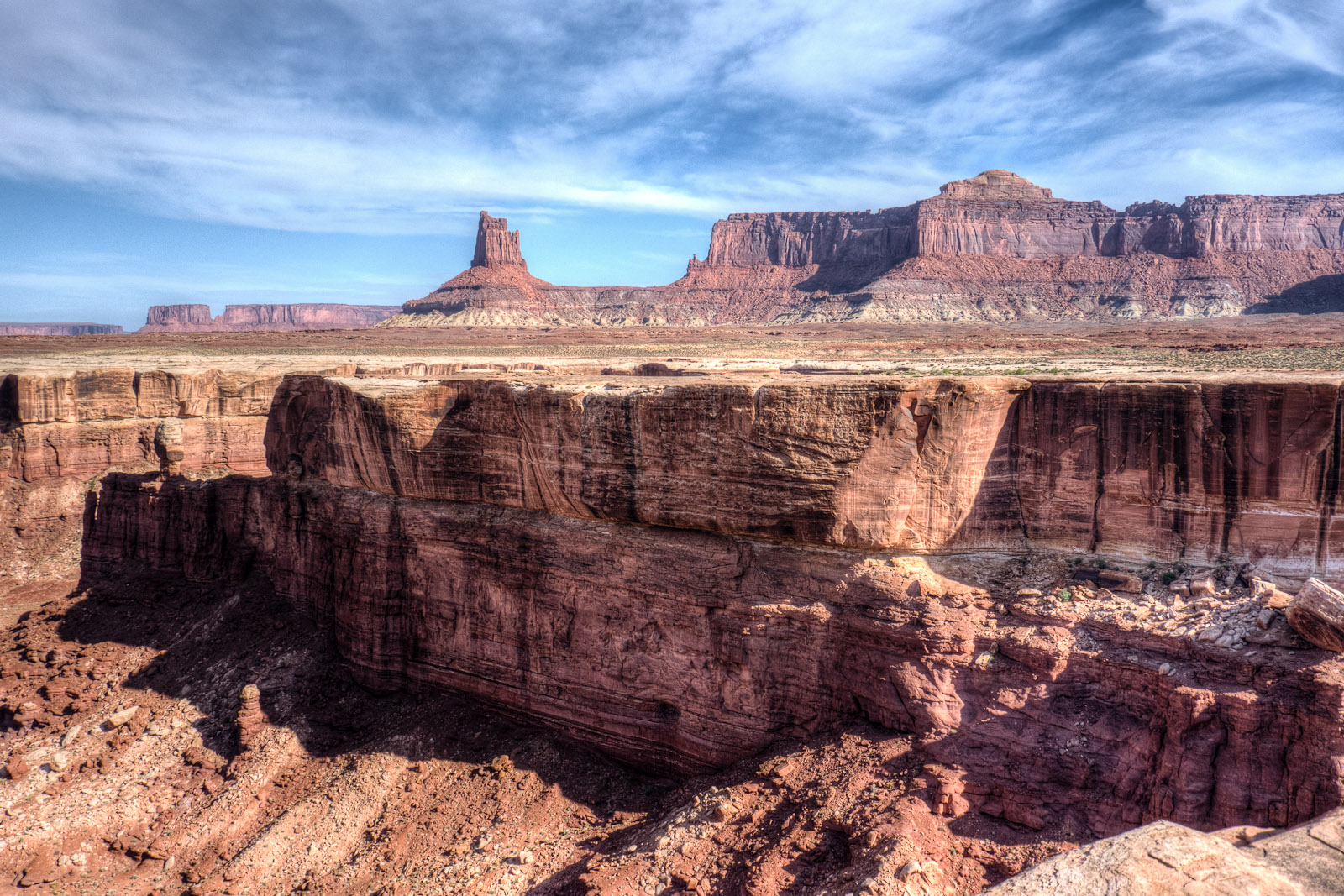

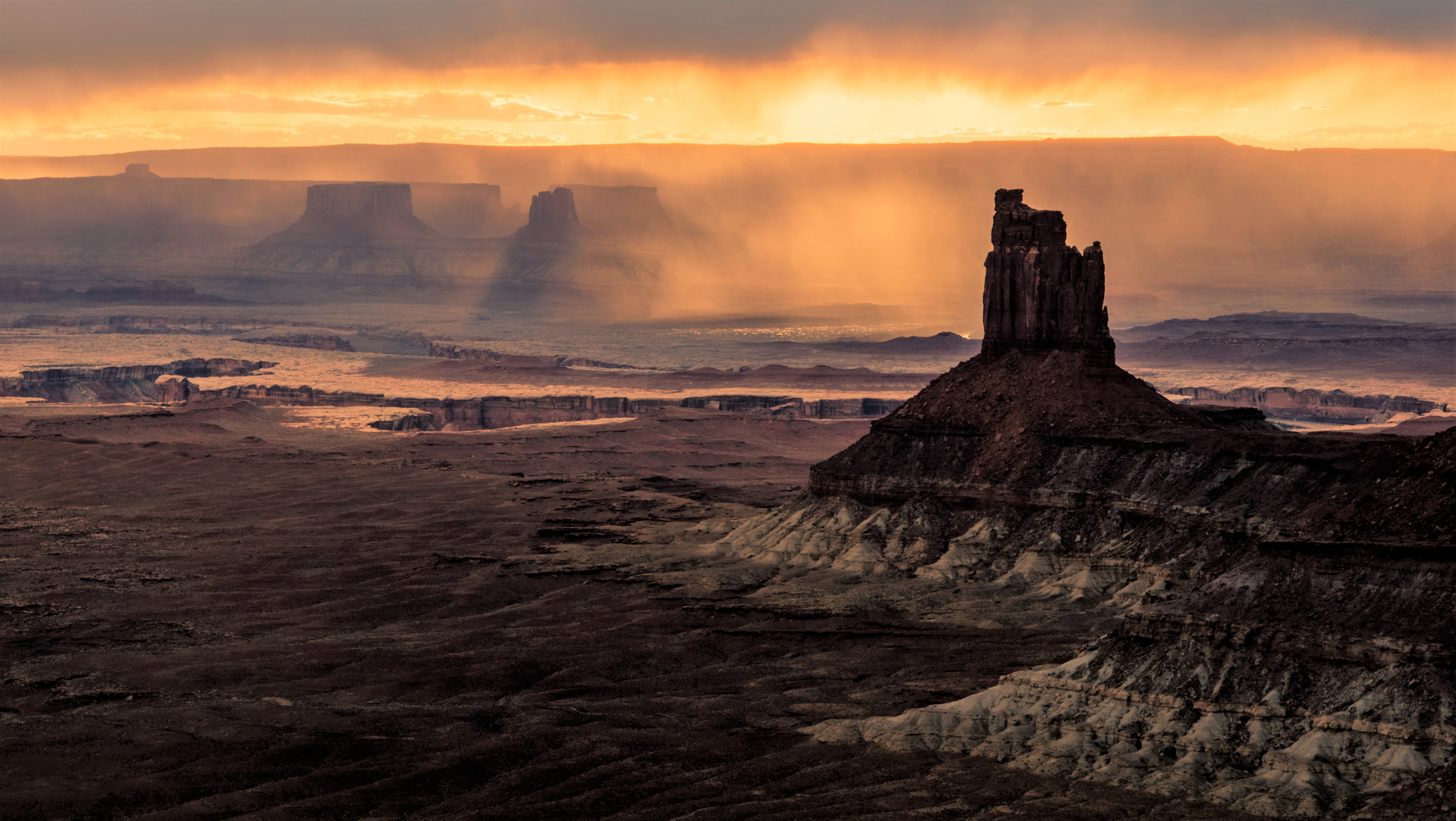
Candlestick Tower (right), Buttes of the Cross to left in the distance

== See also ==
- Colorado Plateau
- Geology of the Canyonlands area
