= Buttes of the Cross =

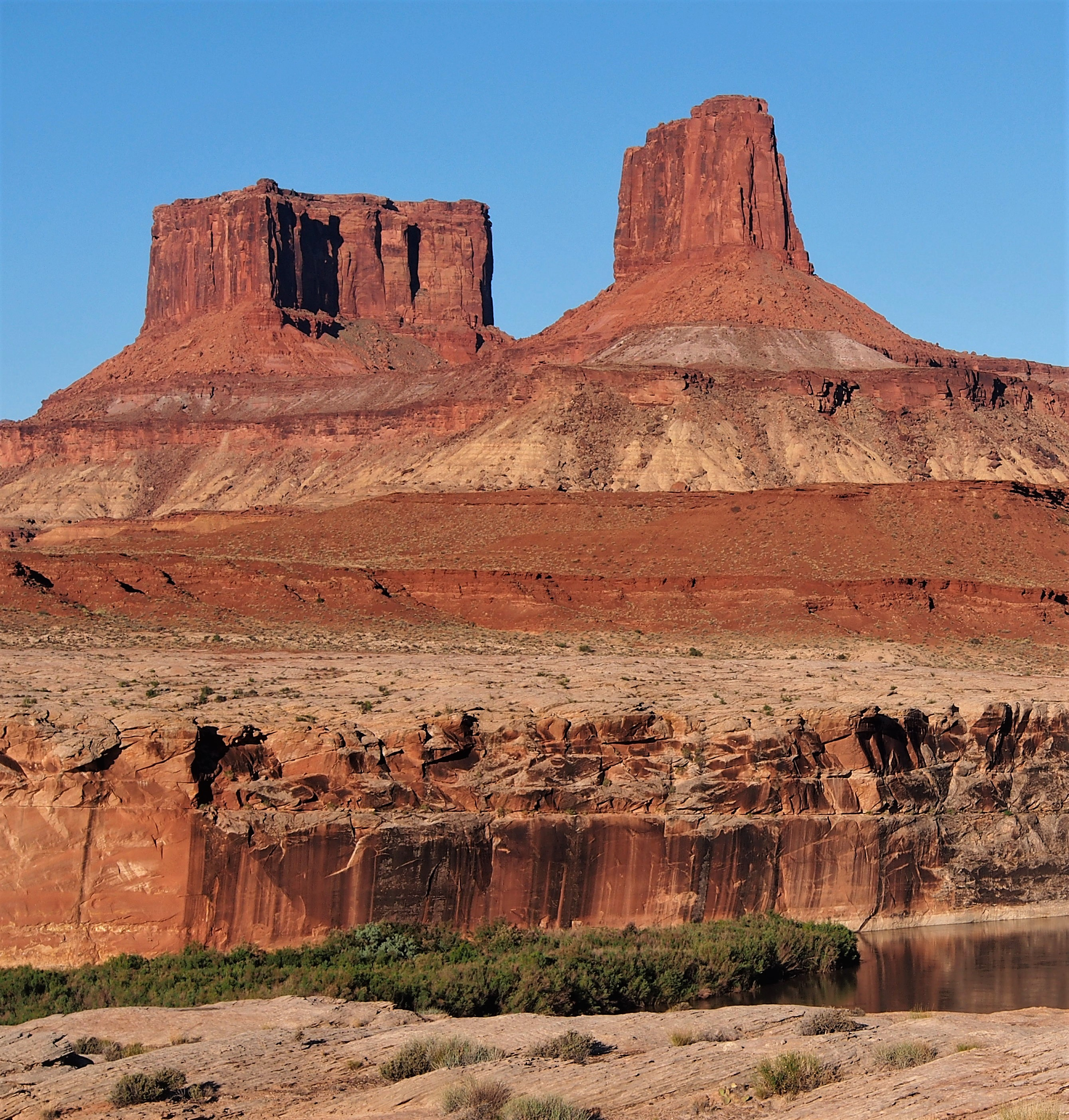
- Buttes of the Cross, east aspect

Highest point
- Elevation: 5,642 ft (1,720 m)
- Prominence: 1,042 ft (318 m)
- Parent peak: Point 5820
- Isolation: 1.59 mi (2.56 km)
- Coordinates: 38°21′45″N 110°03′13″W

Geography
- Location within Utah Location within the United States
- Location: Glen Canyon National Recreation Area; Wayne County, Utah, US
- Parent range: Colorado Plateau
- Topo map: USGS Cleopatras Chair

Geology
- Rock age: Late Triassic
- Rock type: Wingate Sandstone

Climbing
- Easiest route: class 5.x climbing

Buttes of the Cross is two sandstone summits located in the northern reach of Glen Canyon National Recreation Area, in Wayne County of Utah, United States. The larger and higher south butte reaches an elevation of 5,642 feet (1,720 meters), whereas the north butte rises to 5,569 feet, with approximately 0.6 miles (0.97 km) separation between them. When viewed from the north-northeast near Labyrinth Canyon, they align to form the shape of a cross, creating the appearance of a single butte. The name "Butte of the Cross" was first applied by John Wesley Powell during the Powell Geographic Expedition of 1869. A few miles further down the Green River, Powell finds that this geographical feature is two buttes when viewed from the east, so it was renamed Buttes of the Cross. Buttes of the Cross towers over 1,400 feet (430 meters) above its surrounding terrain. It is situated 6.8 miles west of Candlestick Tower, and one-half mile outside the boundary of Canyonlands National Park.

== Geology ==
Buttes of the Cross is composed of hard, fine-grained Wingate Sandstone, which is the remains of wind-borne sand dunes deposited approximately 200 million years ago in the Late Triassic. This Wingate sandstone, capped by Kayenta Formation, forms steep cliffs as it overlays softer layers of the Chinle Formation, which is exposed down to a prominent ledge formed by the Moss Back Member. Slopes below this ledge are Moenkopi Formation, down to the White Rim. Precipitation runoff drains into the nearby Green River, which in turn is part of the Colorado River drainage basin.

== Climbing ==
The first ascent of the North Butte was made May 25, 1987, by Paul Horton and Lynn Watson via West Chimneys. The South Butte was climbed in 1994 by John Rosholt and Keen Butterworth via The Epicurean route, class 5.10c, on the north face.

== Gallery ==
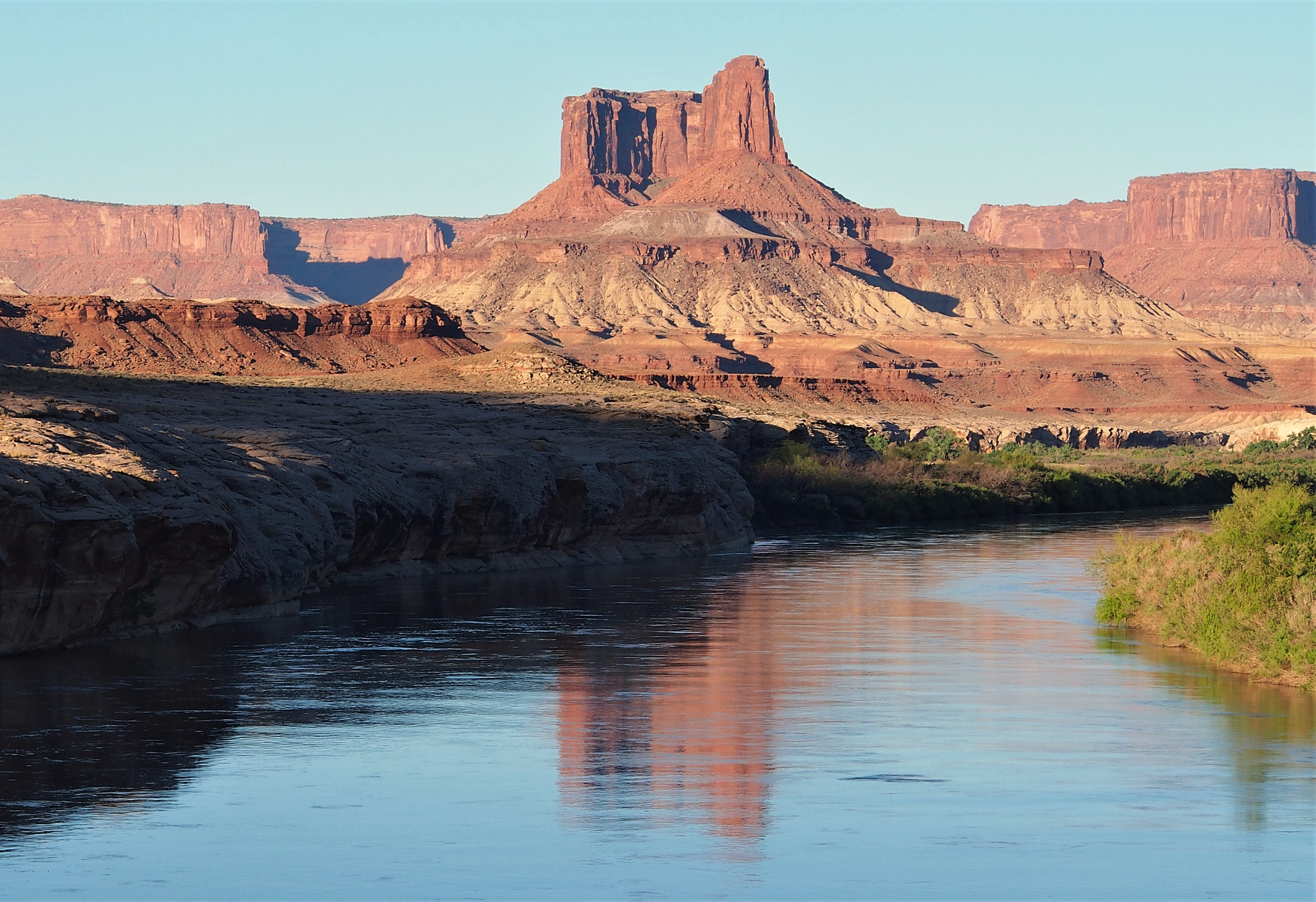
Buttes of the Cross from Green River

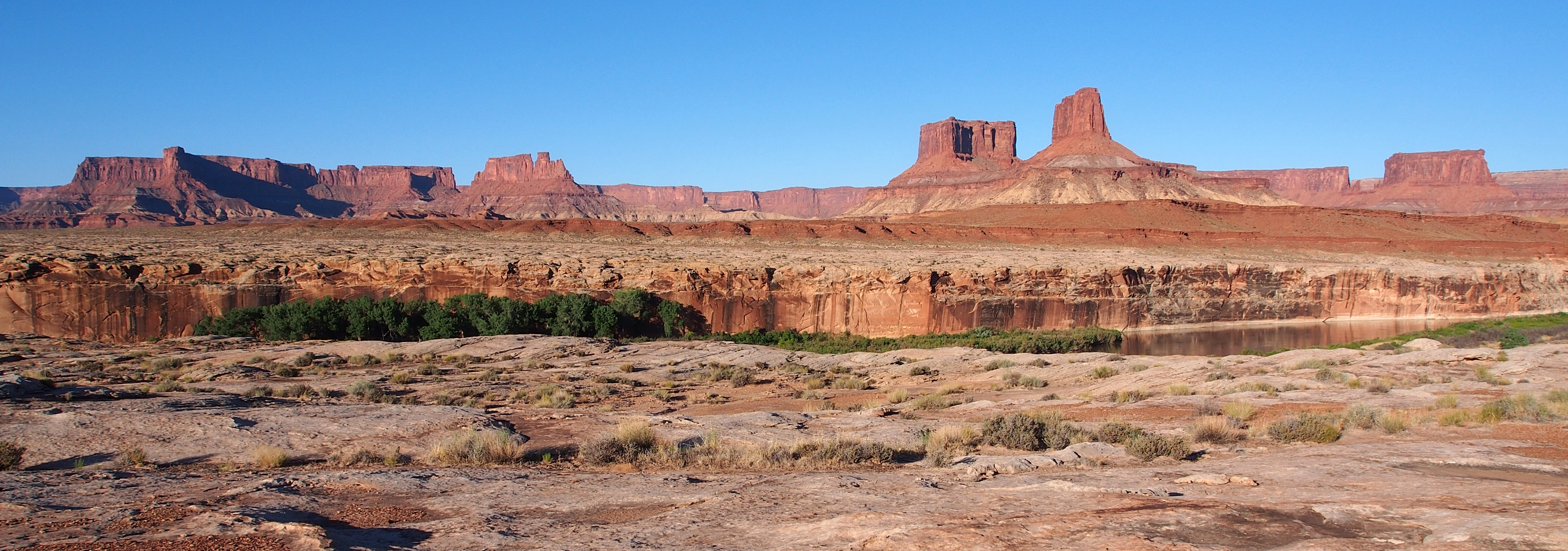
Buttes of the Cross, right of center

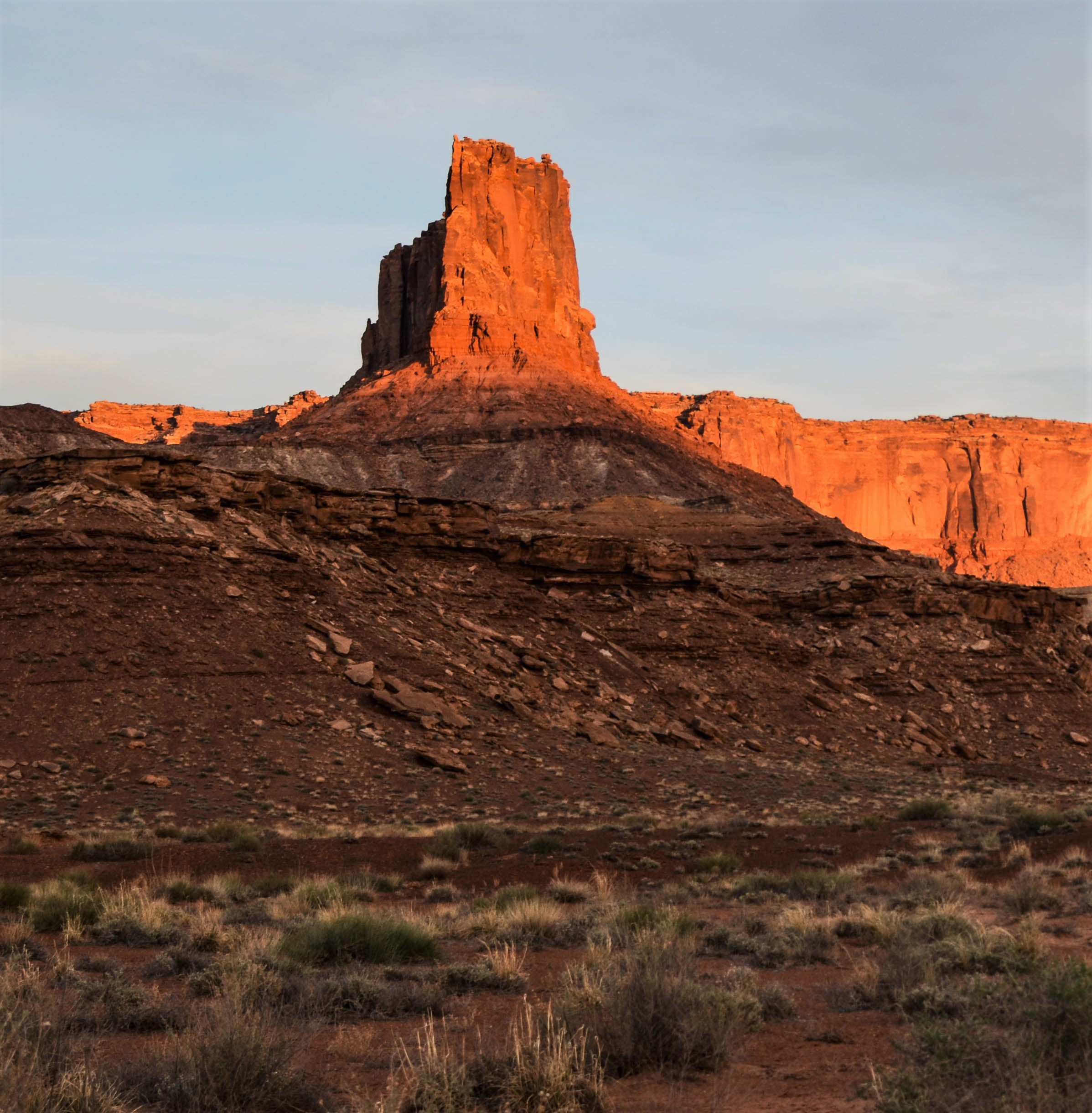
The north butte

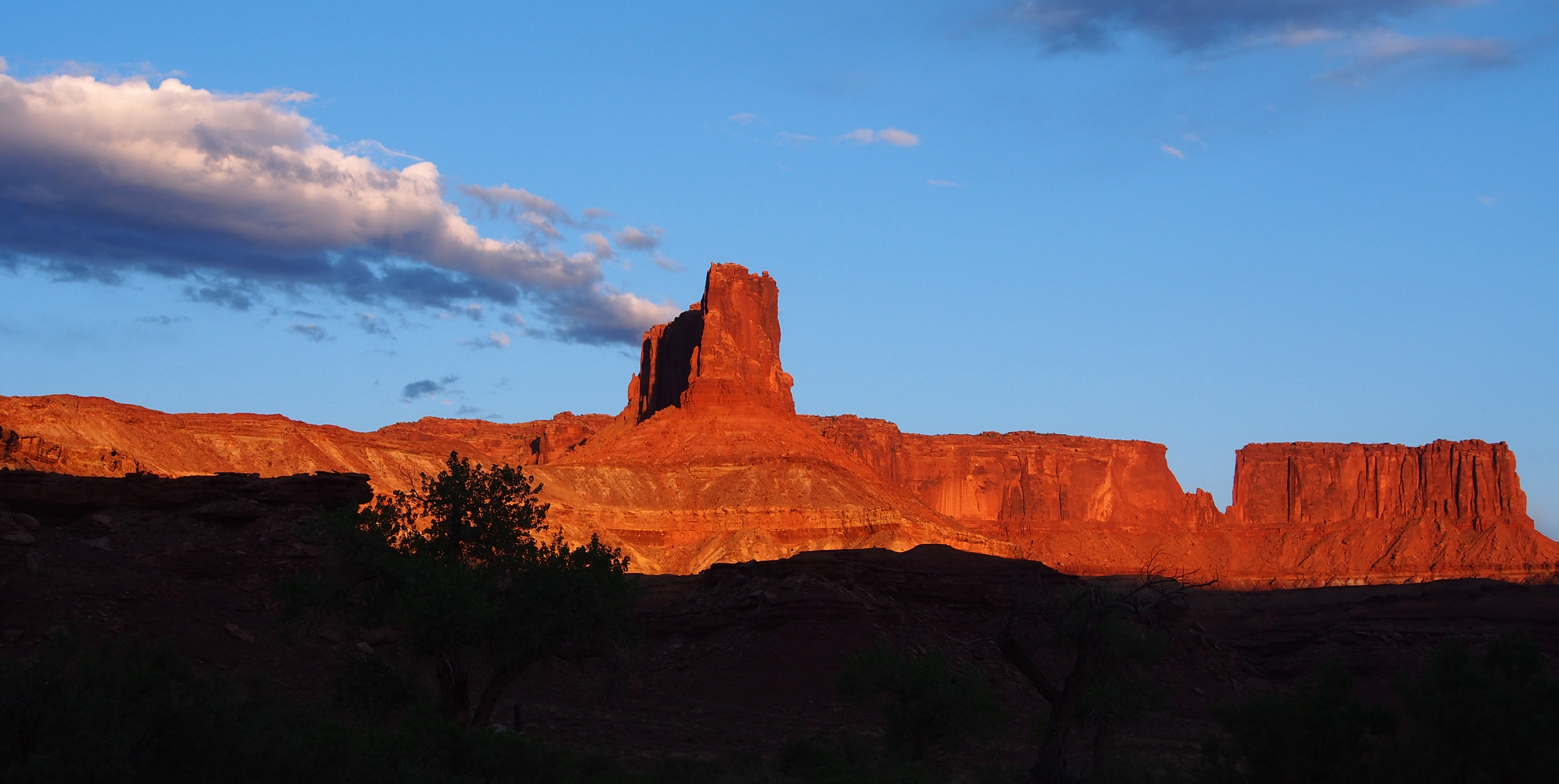
The north butte

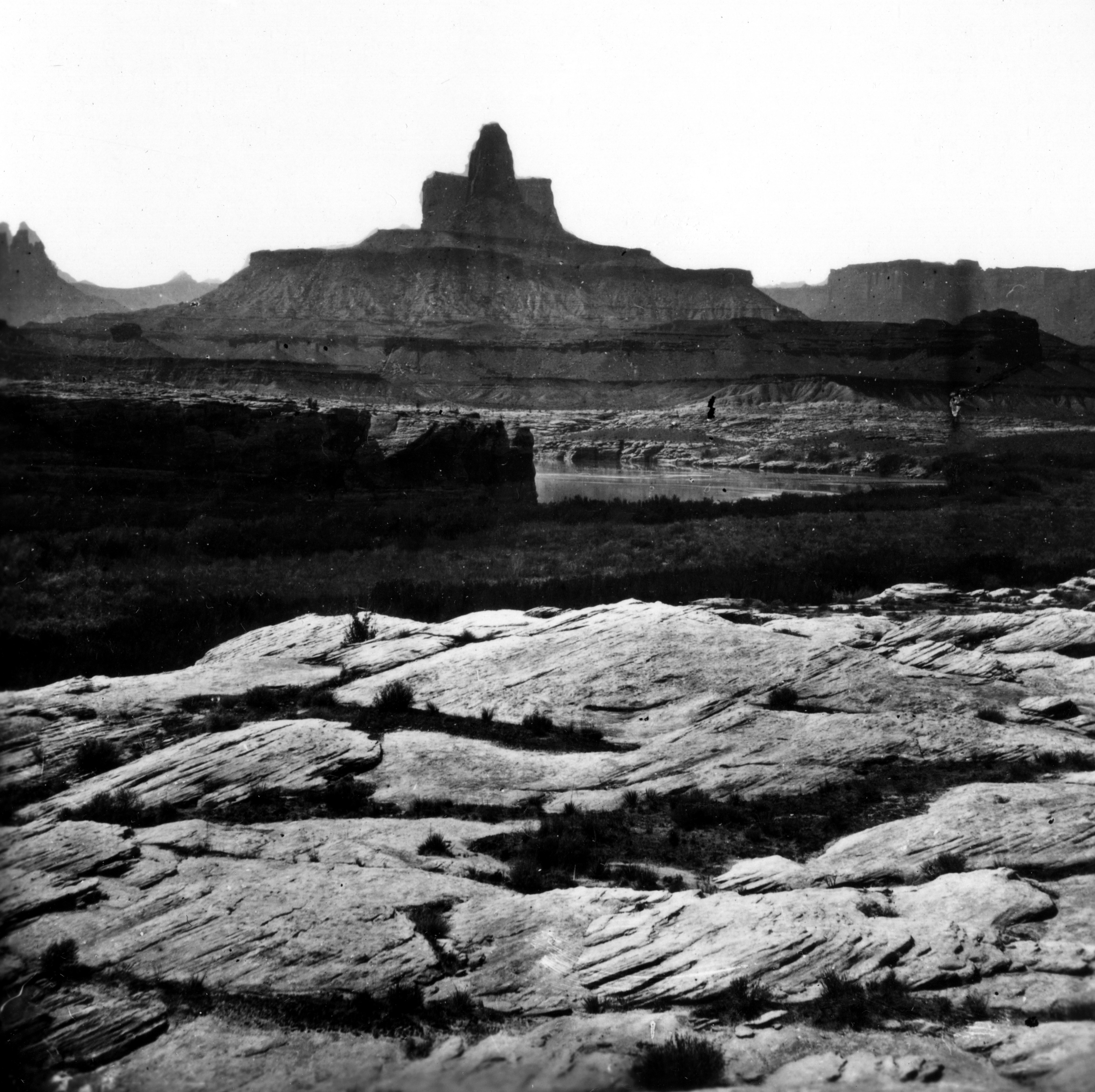
Historical photo by John Karl Hillers from Powell's second expedition (1871–72)

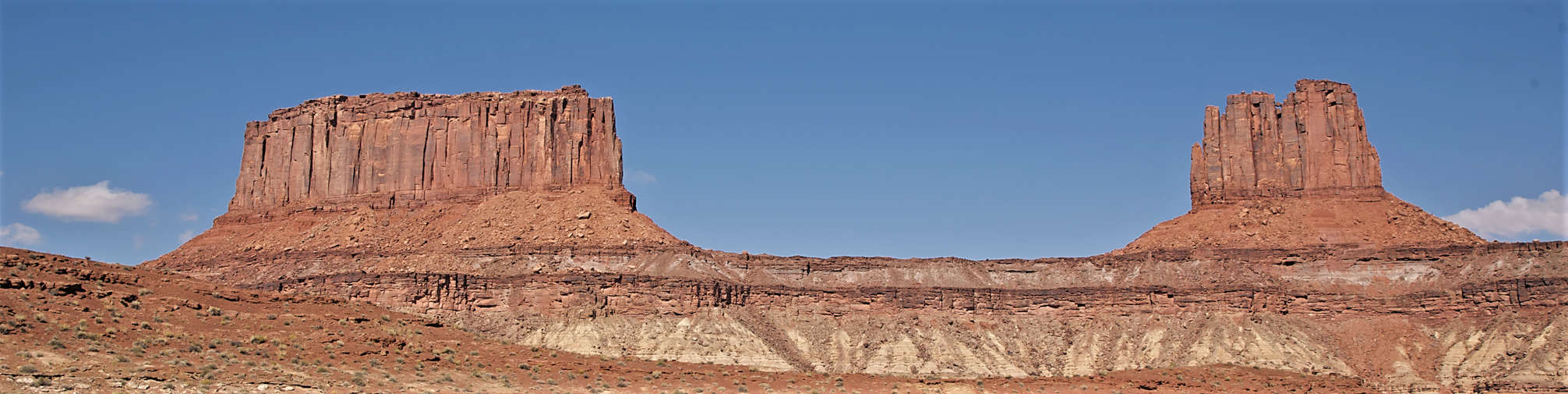
From the southeast

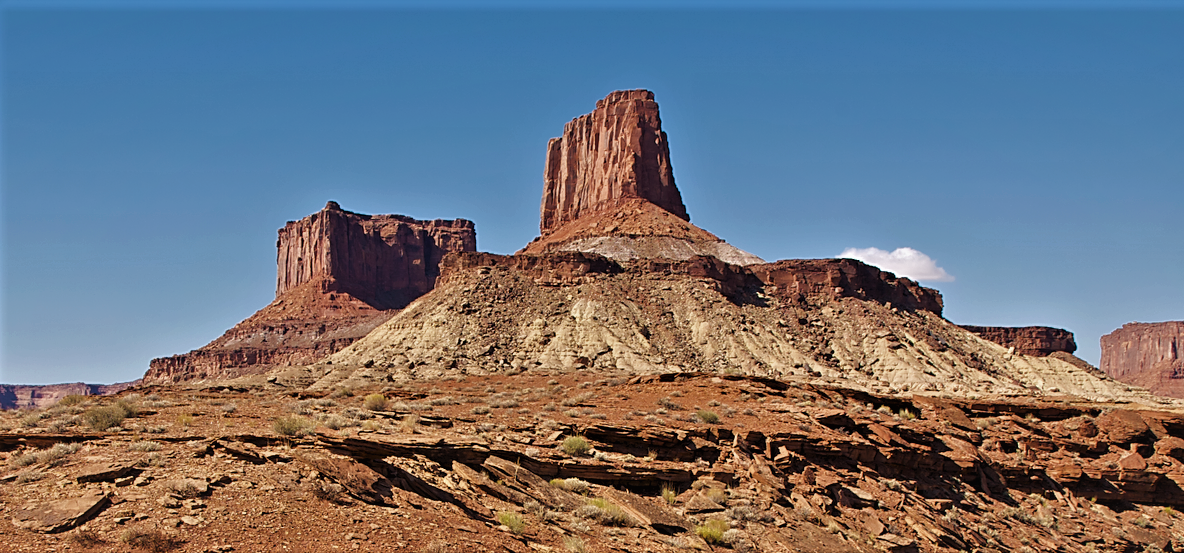

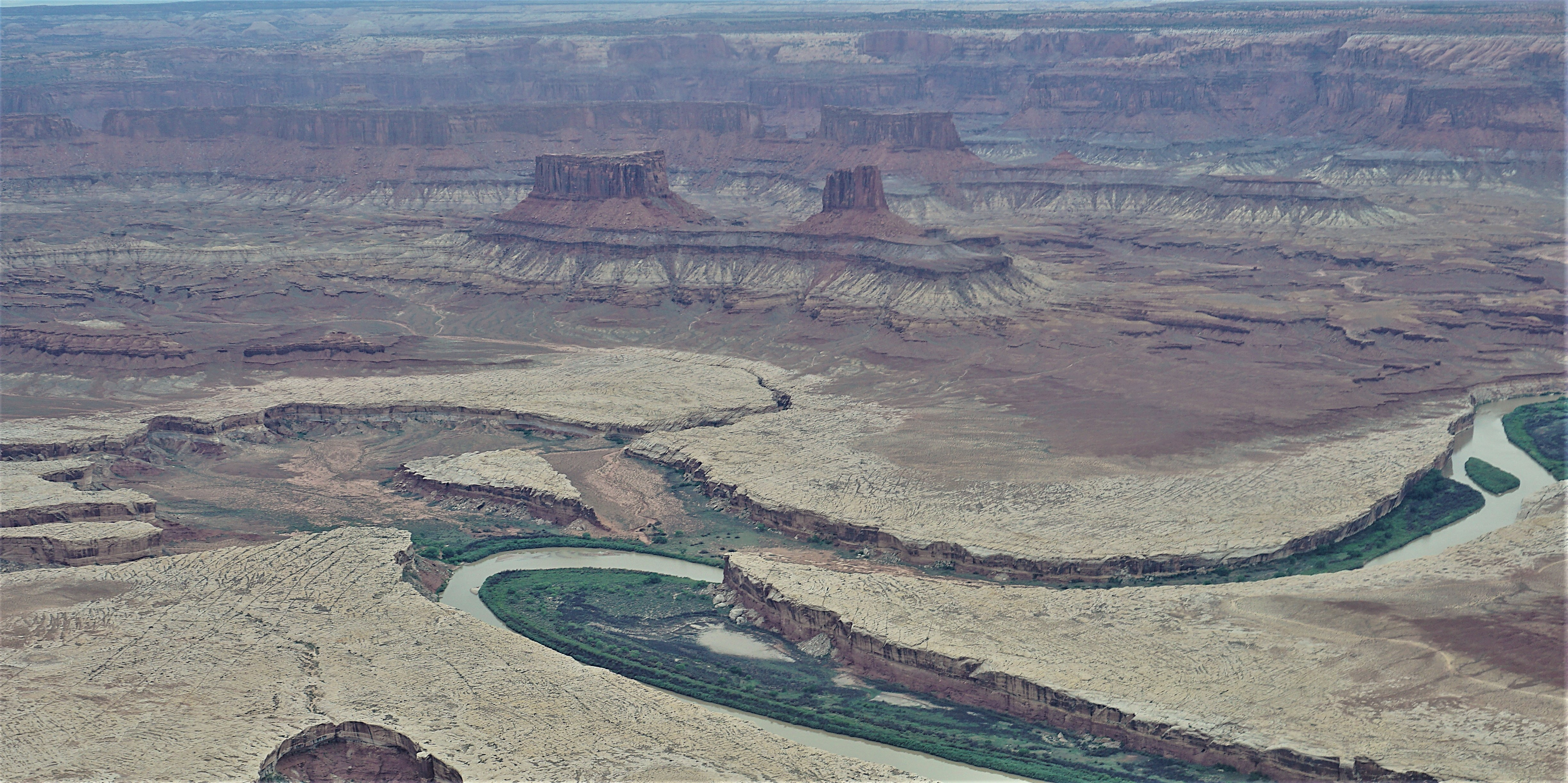
Aerial view from the east

== Climate ==
Spring and fall are the most favorable seasons to visit Buttes of the Cross. According to the Köppen climate classification system, it is located in a cold semi-arid climate zone, which is defined by the coldest month having an average mean temperature below 32 °F (0 °C), and at least 50% of the total annual precipitation being received during the spring and summer. This desert climate receives less than 10 inches (250 millimeters) of annual rainfall, and snowfall is generally light during the winter.

== See also ==
- Geology of the Canyonlands area
- Colorado Plateau
