= Echo Tower =

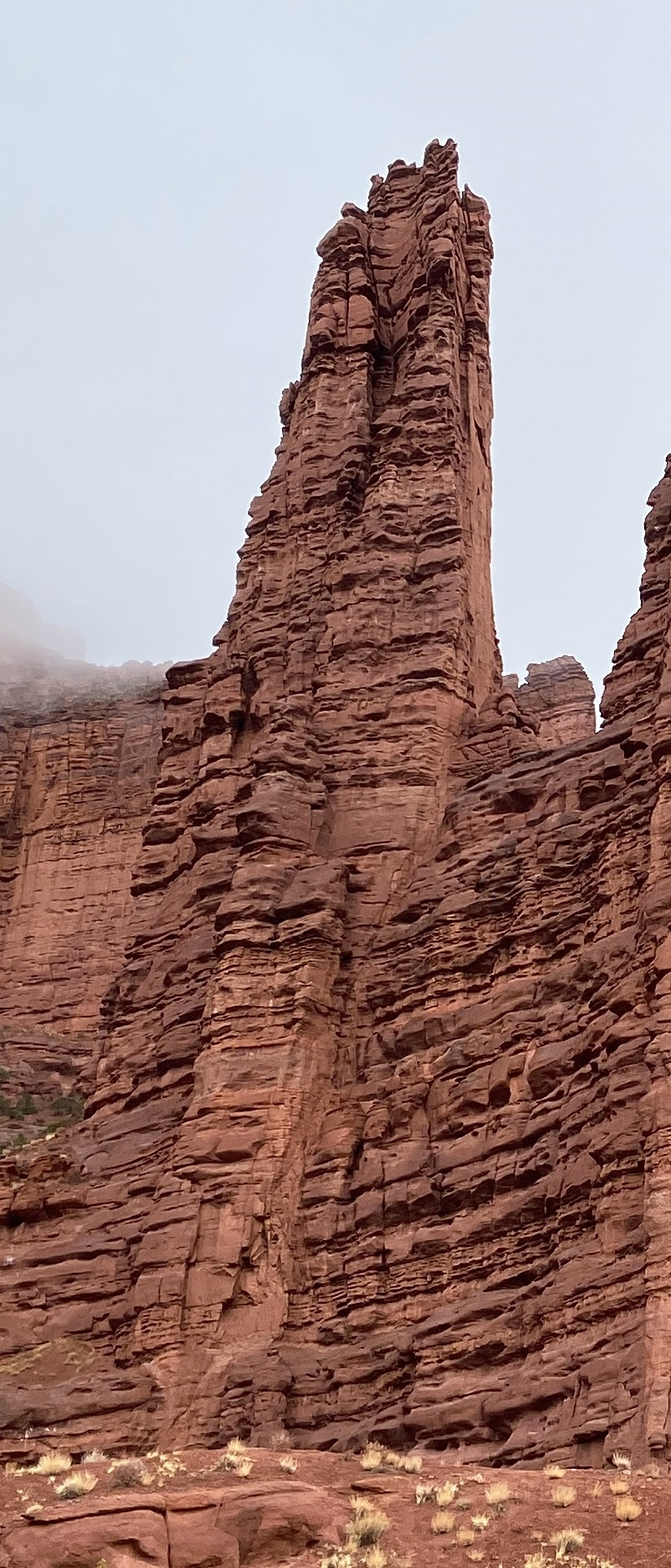
- Northwest aspect

Highest point
- Elevation: 5,784 ft (1,763 m)
- Prominence: 396 ft (121 m)
- Parent peak: Kingfisher Tower
- Isolation: 0.18 mi (0.29 km)
- Coordinates: 38°43′13″N 109°18′03″W

Geography
- Location within Utah Location within the United States
- Country: United States
- State: Utah
- County: Grand
- Parent range: Colorado Plateau
- Topo map: USGS Fisher Towers

Geology
- Rock age: Permian
- Mountain type: Pillar
- Rock type: Sandstone

Climbing
- First ascent: 1966

Echo Tower is a 5,784-foot-elevation (1,763-meter) pillar in Grand County, Utah, United States.

== Description ==
Echo Tower is located 17 miles (27 km) northeast of Moab, Utah, in the Fisher Towers, on land administered by the Bureau of Land Management. Echo ranks as the third-steepest peak in the United States. Topographic relief is significant as the summit rises 800 feet (244 meters) above the tower's base. Precipitation runoff from the tower drains to Onion Creek which empties into the Colorado River, approximately three miles to the west. Access is via Fisher Towers Road from Route 128, and hiking the Fisher Towers Trail. Echo Tower is briefly shown (as a parachute flies by) in the opening scene of the film Austin Powers in Goldmember.

== Climbing ==
The first ascent of the summit was made on October 19, 1966, by Harvey T. Carter, Fred Beckey, and Eric Bjørnstad via the class 5.8 North Chimney route.

Other rock-climbing routes on Echo Tower:

- Run Amok - class 5.9 – Jim Beyer – (1979)
- Phantom Sprint – class 5.9 – Jim Beyer – (1986)
- The Tapeworm – class 5.8 – Brad Jarrett, Brian Warshaw – (1994)
- Emotional Grafitti – class 5.10 – Mike Baker, Leslie Henderson, Zach Merritt – (1994)
- The Iron Chef – class 5.7 – Chip Wilson, Steve Bartlett – (2007)
- Sidewinder – class 5.7+ – Paul Gagner, Jeremy Aslaksen – (2010)
- Bad Religons – Jim Beyer

== Geology ==
Echo Tower is set on a fin and is composed of sandstone and mudstone of the Permian Cutler Formation. The reddish coloration of the rock is a result of varying amounts of hematite.

== Climate ==
Spring and fall are the most favorable seasons to visit Echo Tower. According to the Köppen climate classification system, it is located in a cold semi-arid climate zone with cold winters and hot summers. Summers highs rarely exceed 100 °F (38 °C). Summer nights are comfortably cool, and temperatures drop quickly after sunset. Winters are cold, but daytime highs are usually above freezing. Winter temperatures below 0 °F (−18 °C) are uncommon, though possible. This desert climate receives less than 10 inches (250 millimeters) of annual rainfall, and snowfall is generally light during the winter.

== See also ==
- Fisher Towers

== Gallery ==
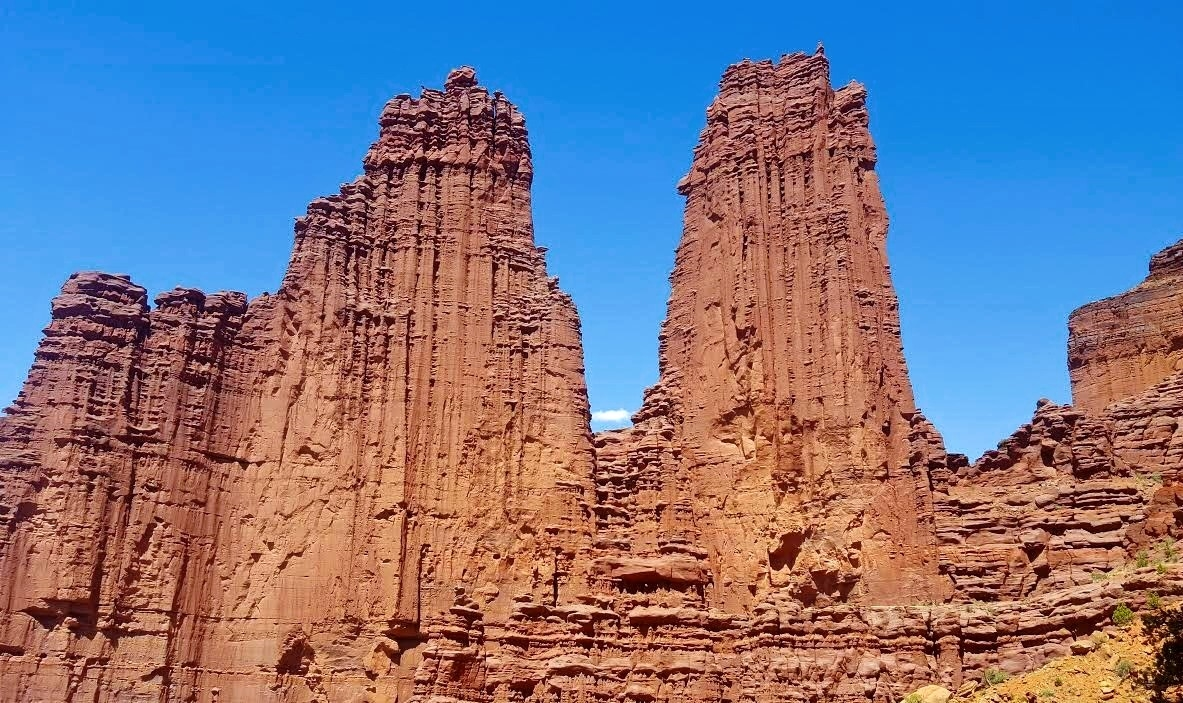
South aspect of Cottontail Tower (left) and Echo Tower to right

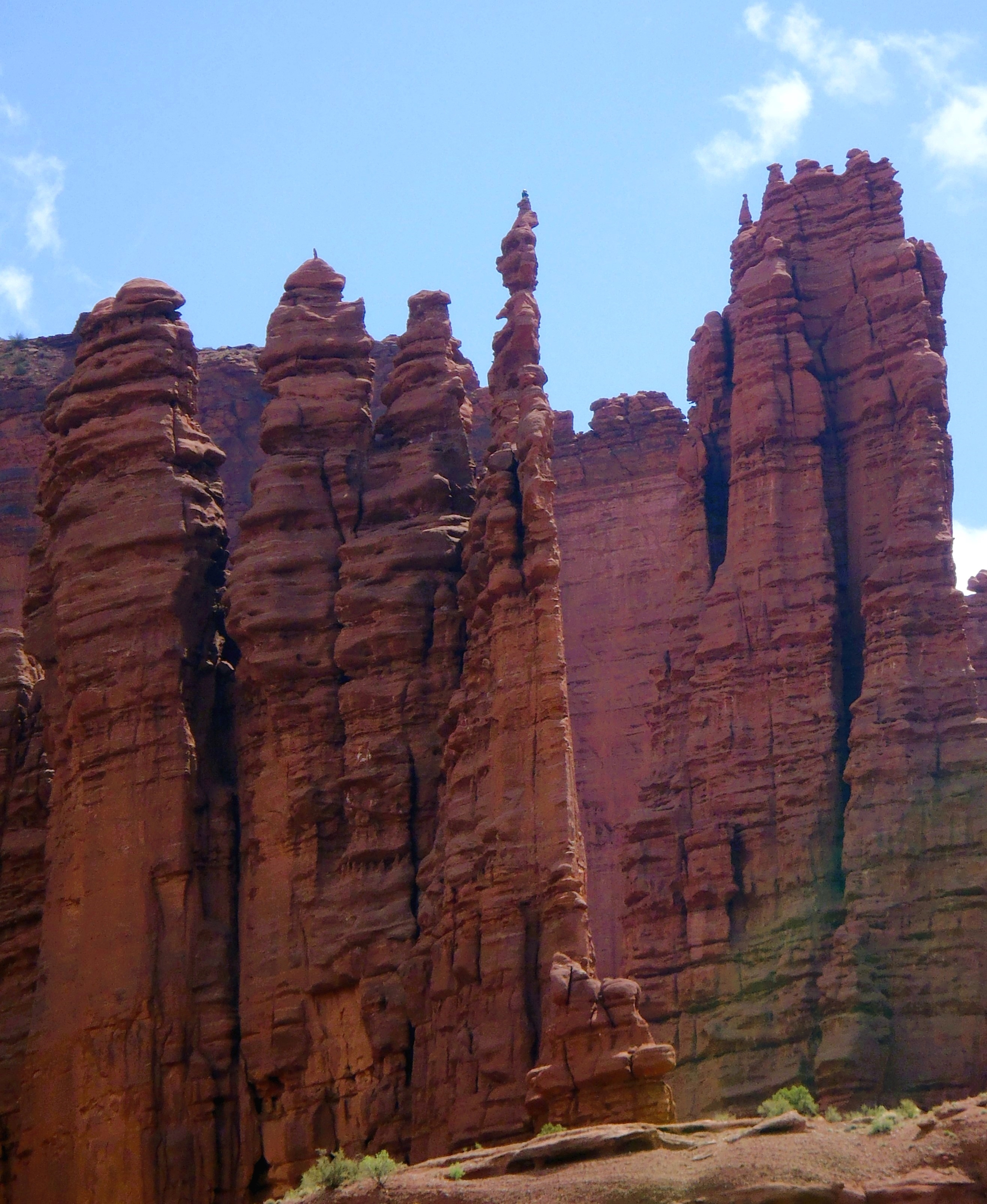
Ancient Art to left, Echo to right

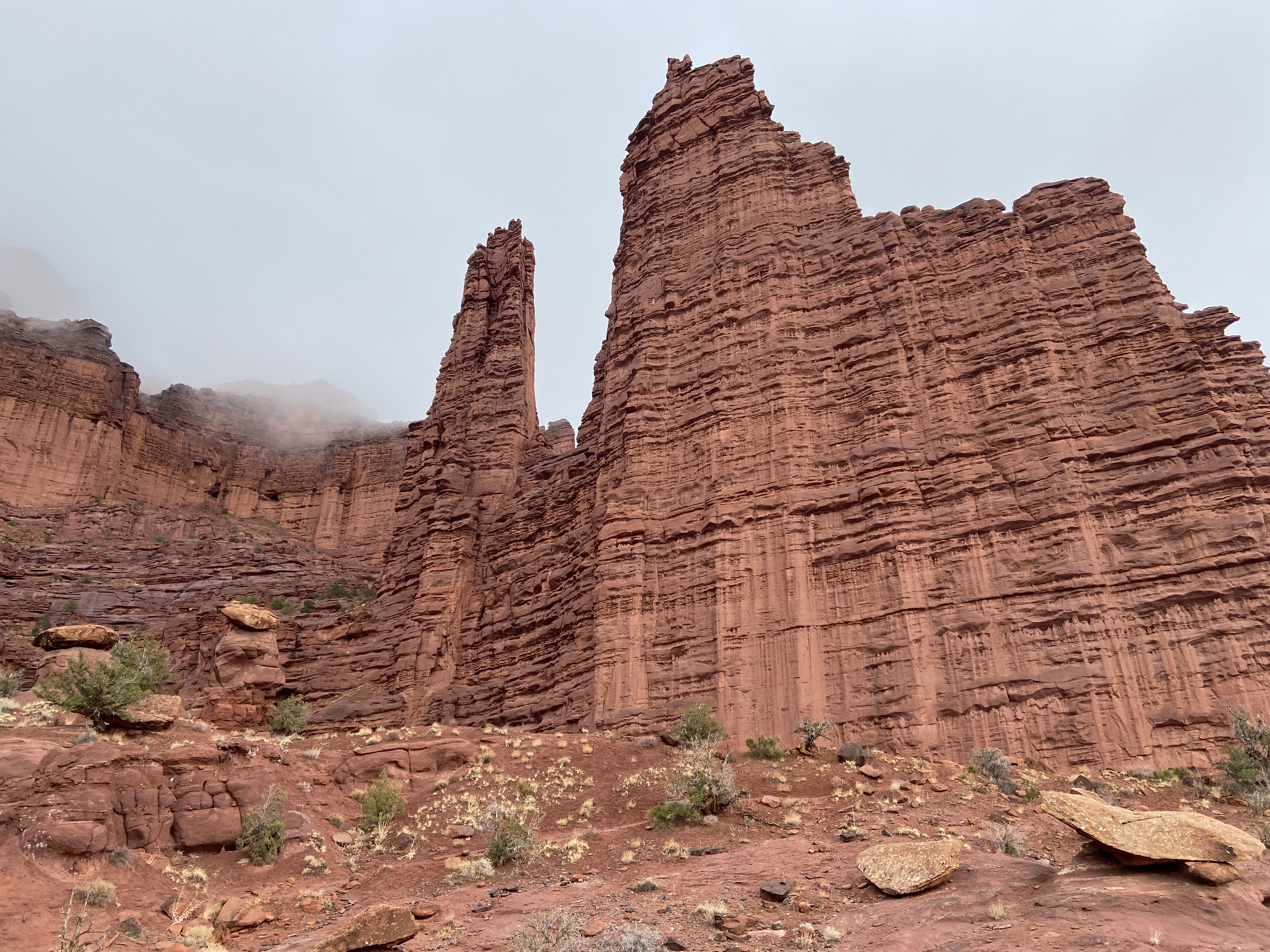
Cottontail Tower, with Echo Tower to left

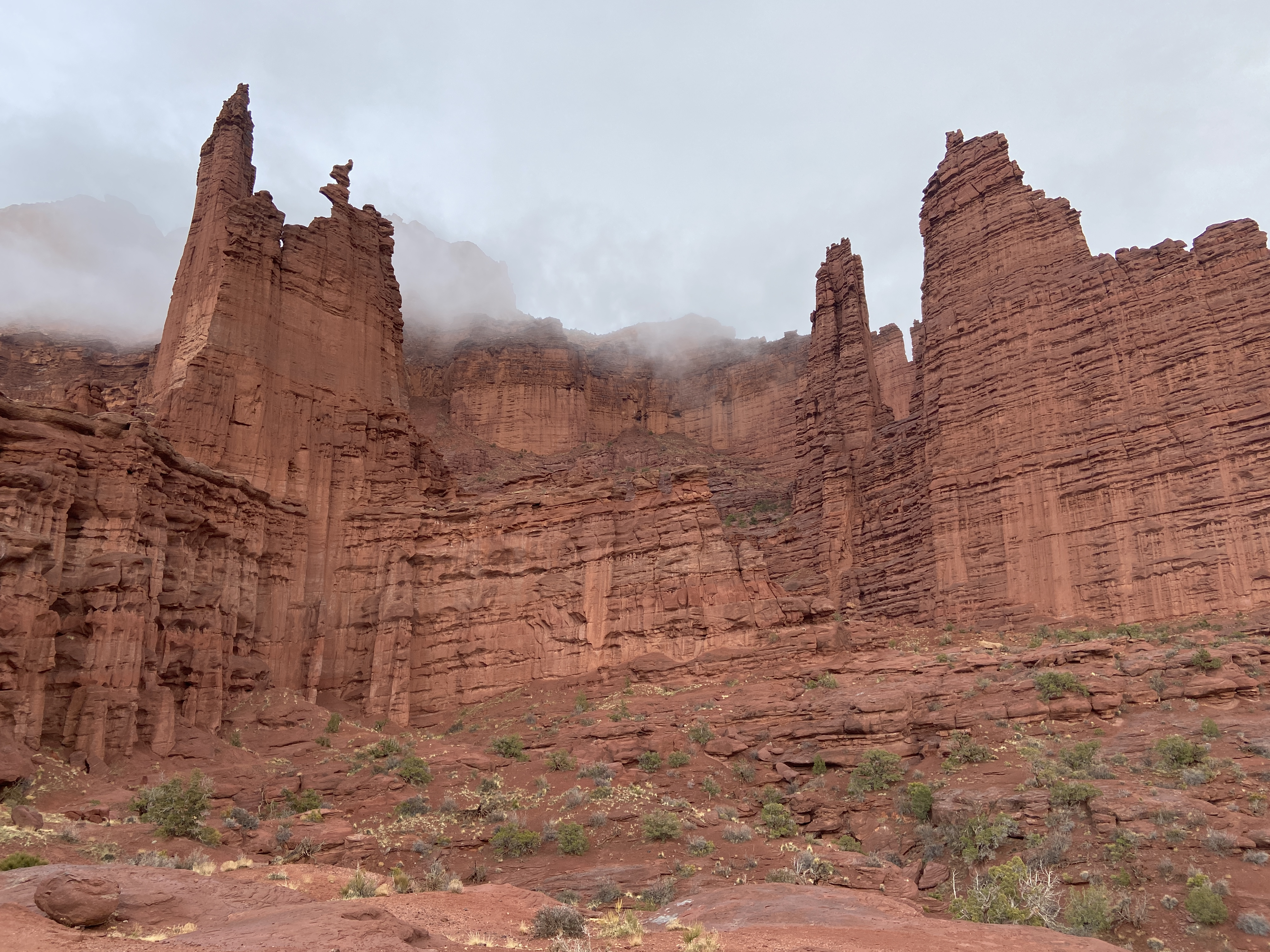
Kingfisher/Ancient Art to left, Echo and Cottontail to right

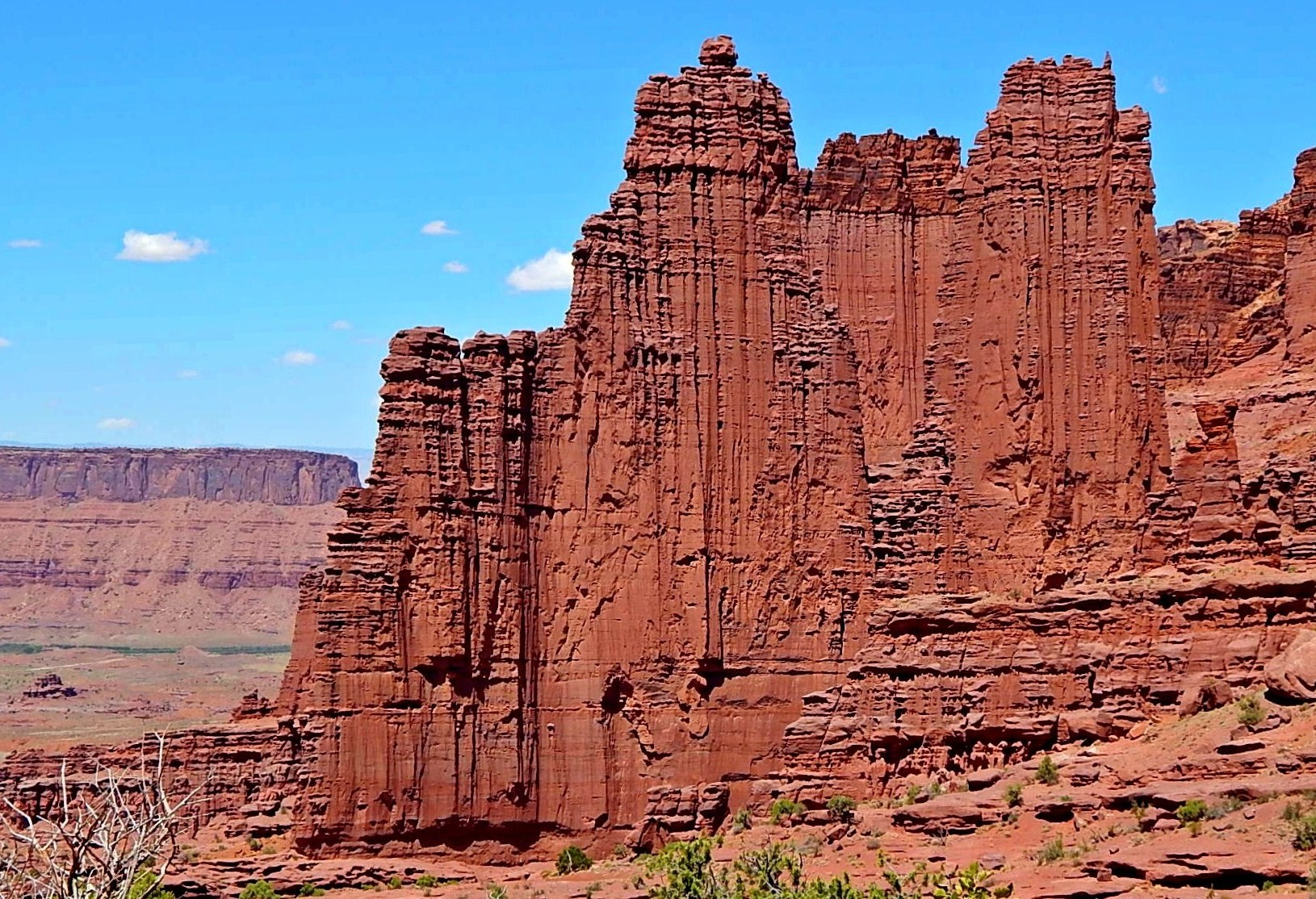
South aspect of Cottontail Tower centered, Echo Tower to right, and Kingfisher fills in the V-gap between.

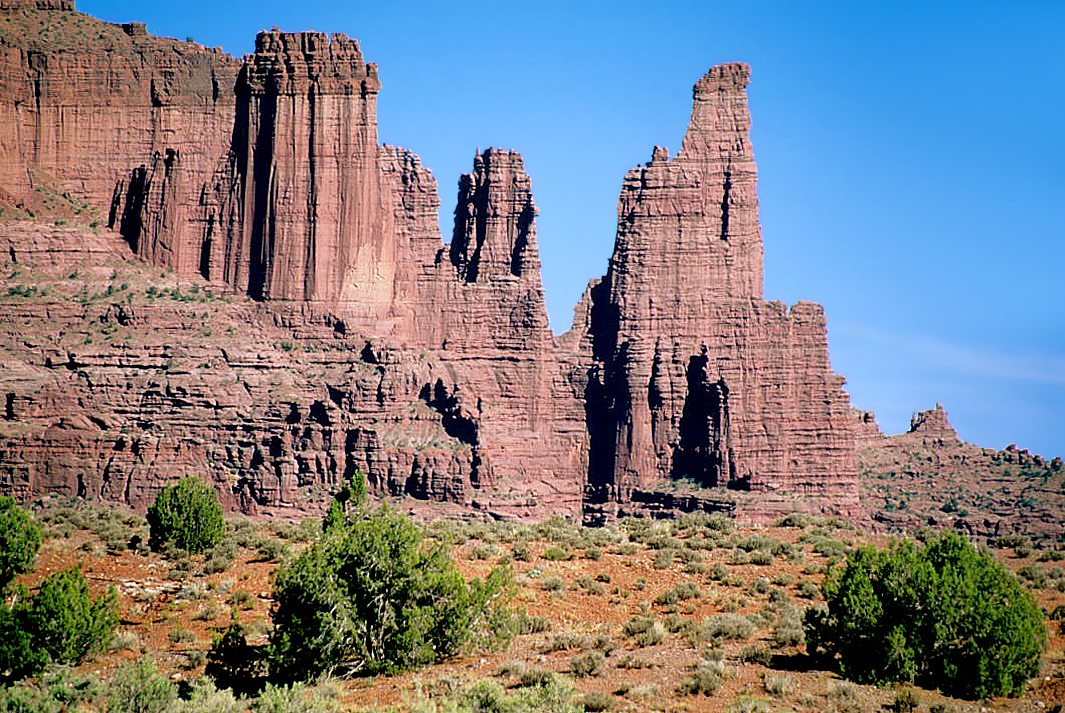
Viewed from the north: Kingfisher (left), Echo (center), Cottontail/Titan (right)

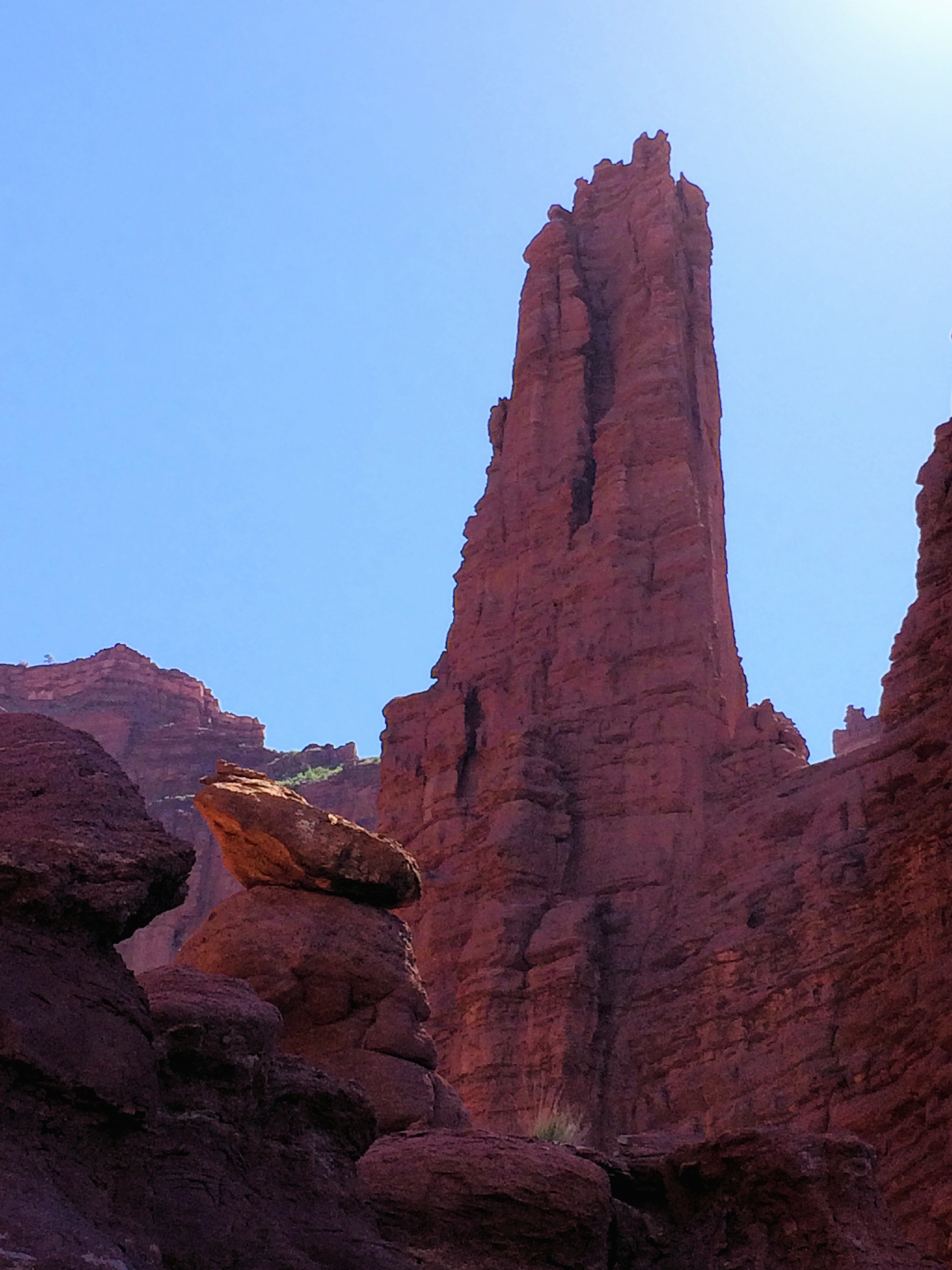
NW aspect

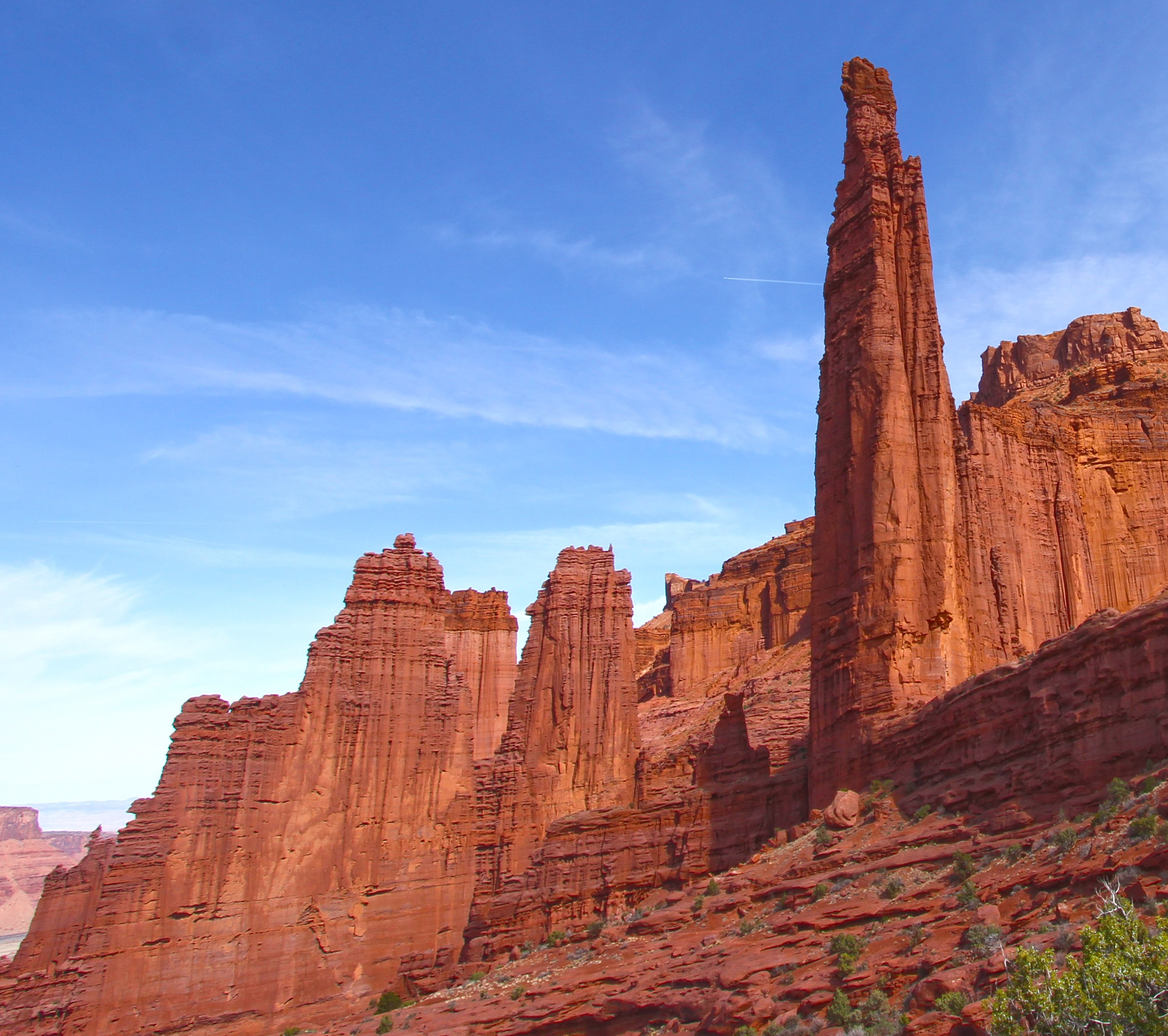
Cottontail Tower (left), Echo Tower (center), The Titan (right) viewed from the south
