= Ancient Art (Fisher Towers) =

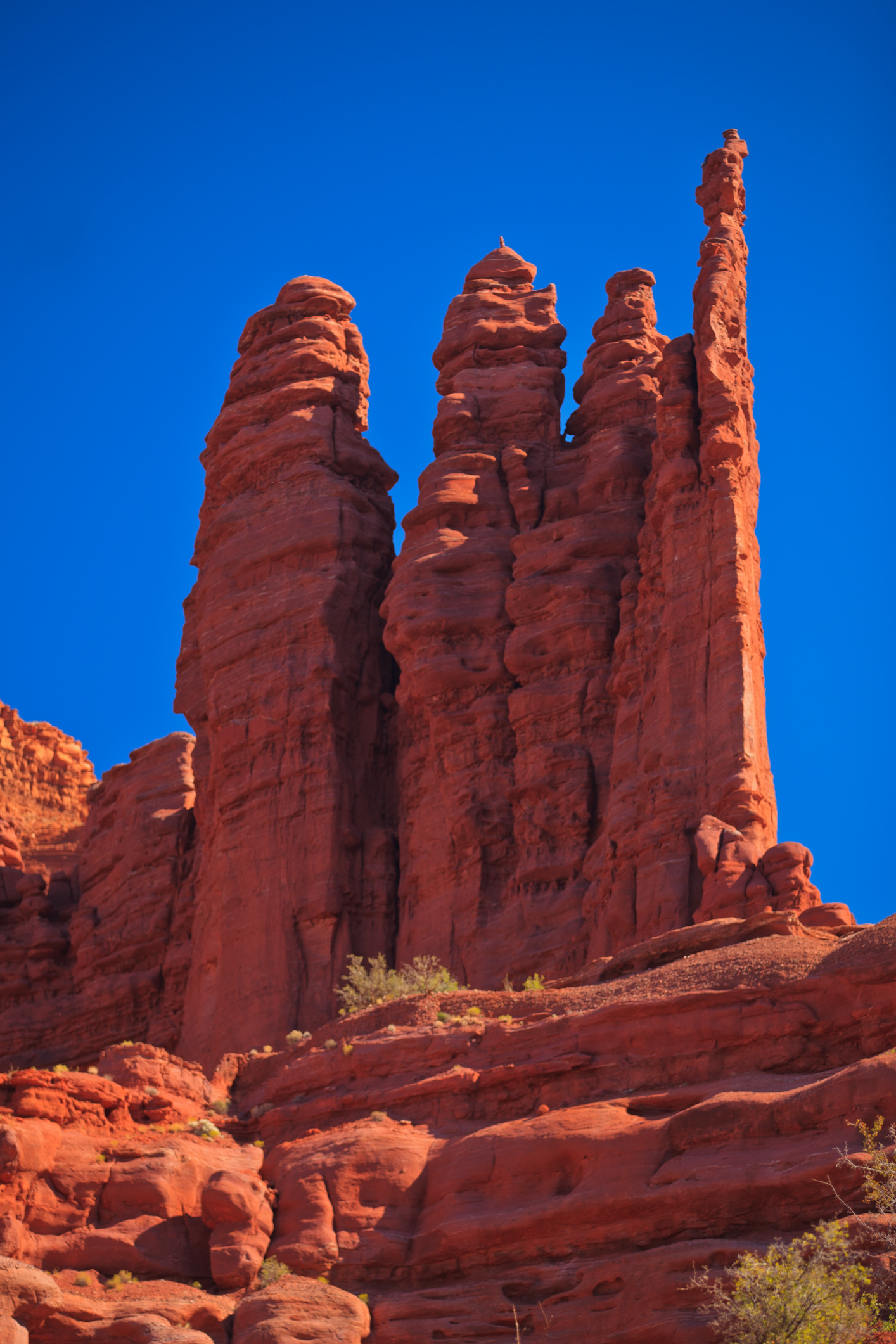
- Northwest aspect

Highest point
- Elevation: 5,420 ft (1,652 m)
- Prominence: 160 ft (49 m)
- Parent peak: Kingfisher Tower
- Isolation: 0.13 mi (0.21 km)
- Coordinates: 38°43′18″N 109°18′16″W

Geography
- Location within Utah Location within the United States
- Country: United States
- State: Utah
- County: Grand
- Parent range: Colorado Plateau
- Topo map: USGS Fisher Towers

Geology
- Rock age: Permian
- Mountain type: Pillar
- Rock type: Sandstone

Climbing
- First ascent: 1967

Ancient Art is a 5,420-foot-elevation (1,652-meter) pillar in Grand County, Utah, United States.

== Description ==
Ancient Art is located 17 miles (27 km) northeast of Moab, Utah, in the Fisher Towers, on land administered by the Bureau of Land Management. There are four summits known as the North Summit (highest), Corkscrew Summit, Middle Summit, and Kient Art Summit. Topographic relief is significant as the summit rises 700 feet (213 meters) above terrain in 0.2 mile (0.32 km). Precipitation runoff from the tower drains to Onion Creek which empties into the Colorado River, approximately three miles to the west. Access is via Fisher Towers Road from Route 128, and hiking on the Fisher Towers Trail.

== Climbing ==
The first ascent of the summit was made June 11, 1967, by Herbie Hendricks and Dennis Willis via the class 5.9 Hippie Route on the North Summit.

Rock-climbing routes on Ancient Art:

- Hippie Route - class 5.9 – Herbie Hendricks, Dennis Willis – (1967)
- Stolen Chimney (Corkscrew Summit) - class 5.10 – Paul Sibley and Bill Roos – (1969)
- Purebred (Middle Summit) - Harvey T. Carter, Dave Erickson, Ken Wyrick – (1971)
- Adjacent Art (Kient Art Summit) - class 5.8 – Pete Takeda, Eric Kohl – (1996)

== Geology ==
Ancient Art is set on an eroded fin and is composed of 290 million years old sandstone, mudstone, and conglomerate of the Permian Cutler Formation. The reddish coloration of the rock is a result of varying amounts of hematite.

== Climate ==
Spring and fall are the most favorable seasons to visit Ancient Art. According to the Köppen climate classification system, it is located in a cold semi-arid climate zone with cold winters and hot summers. Summers highs rarely exceed 100 °F (38 °C). Summer nights are comfortably cool, and temperatures drop quickly after sunset. Winters are cold, but daytime highs are usually above freezing. Winter temperatures below 0 °F (−18 °C) are uncommon, though possible. This desert climate receives less than 10 inches (250 millimeters) of annual rainfall, and snowfall is generally light during the winter.

== See also ==
- Fisher Towers

== Gallery ==
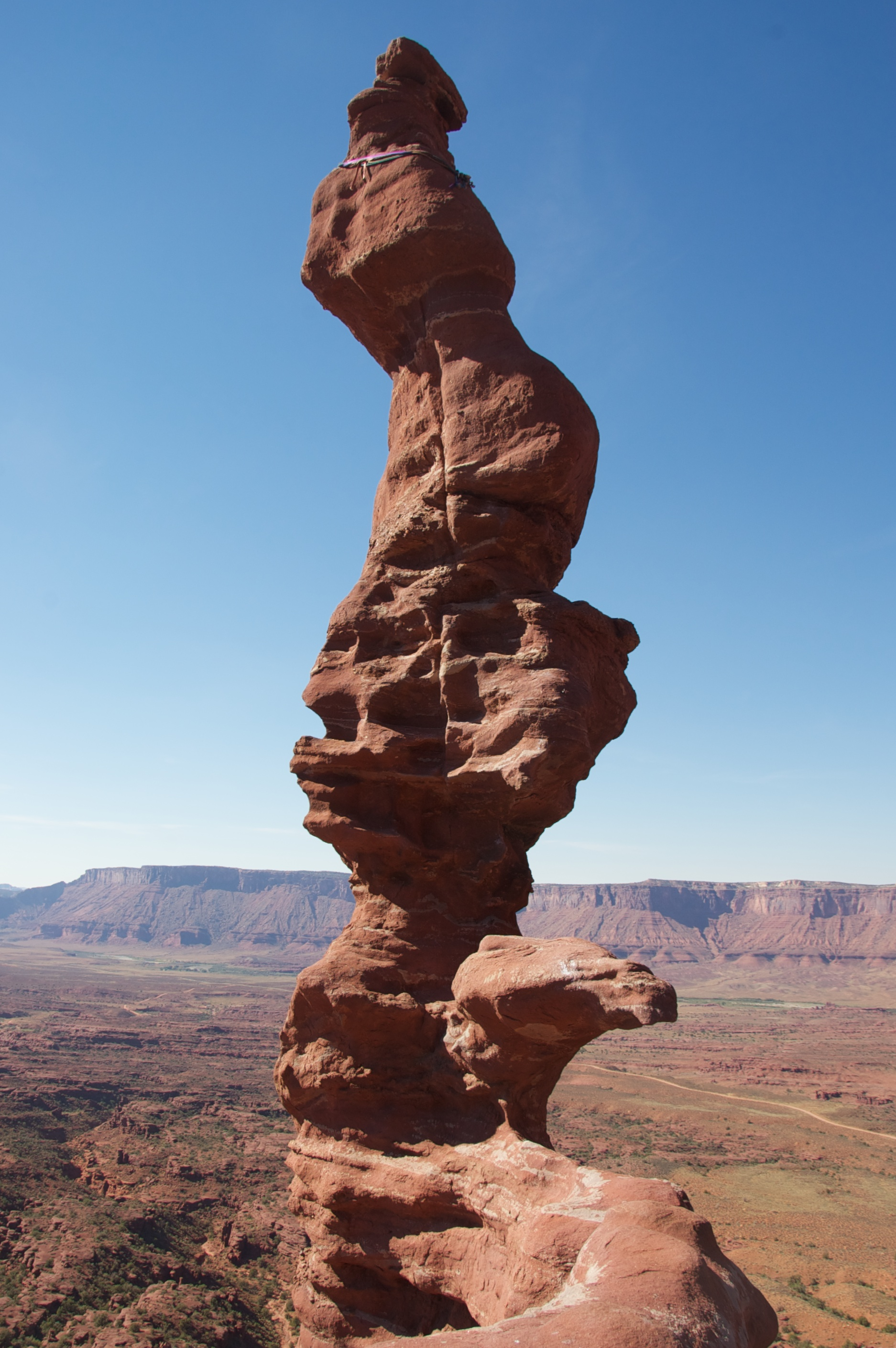
The Corkscrew summit

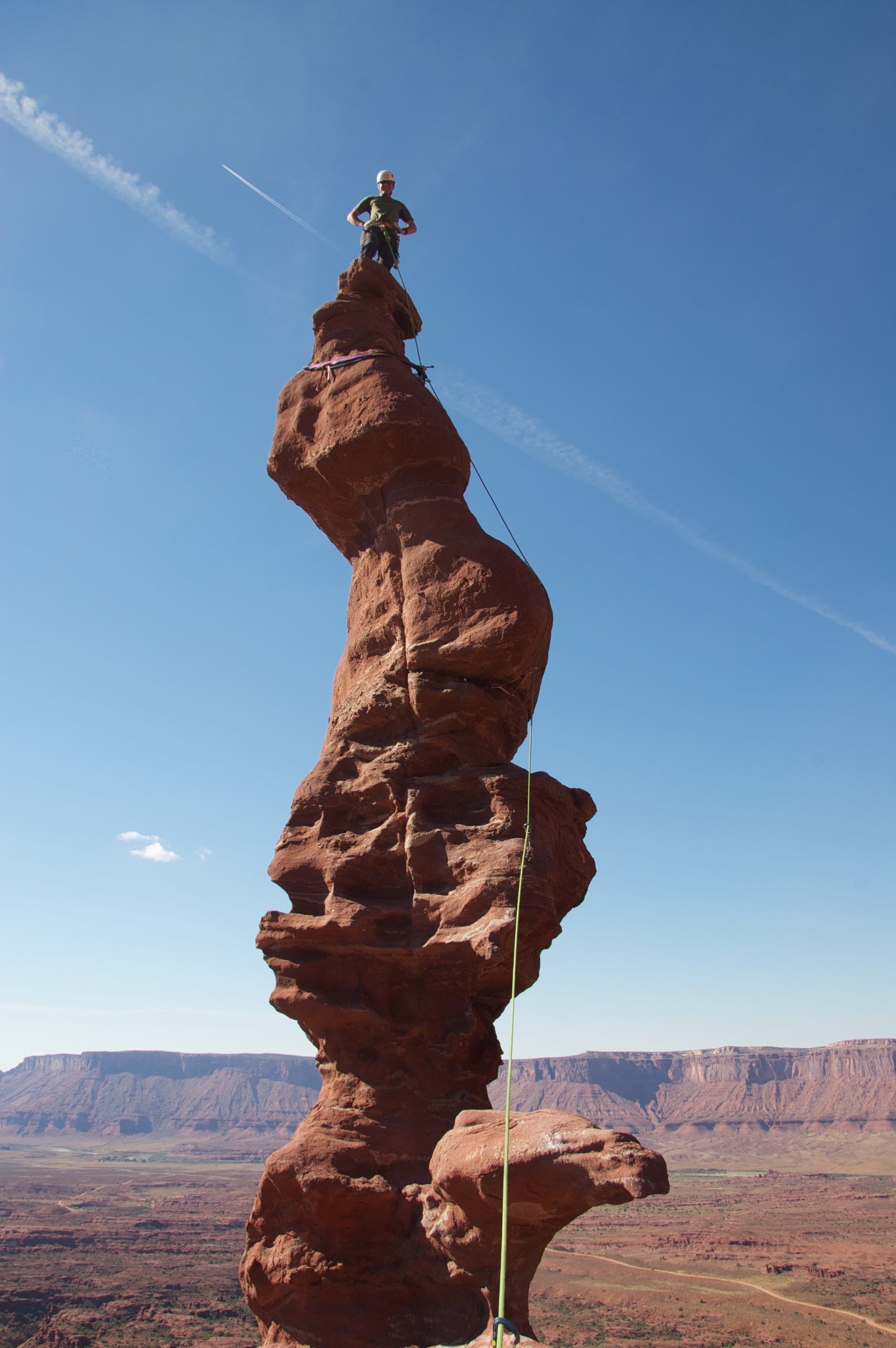
Climber on the Corkscrew

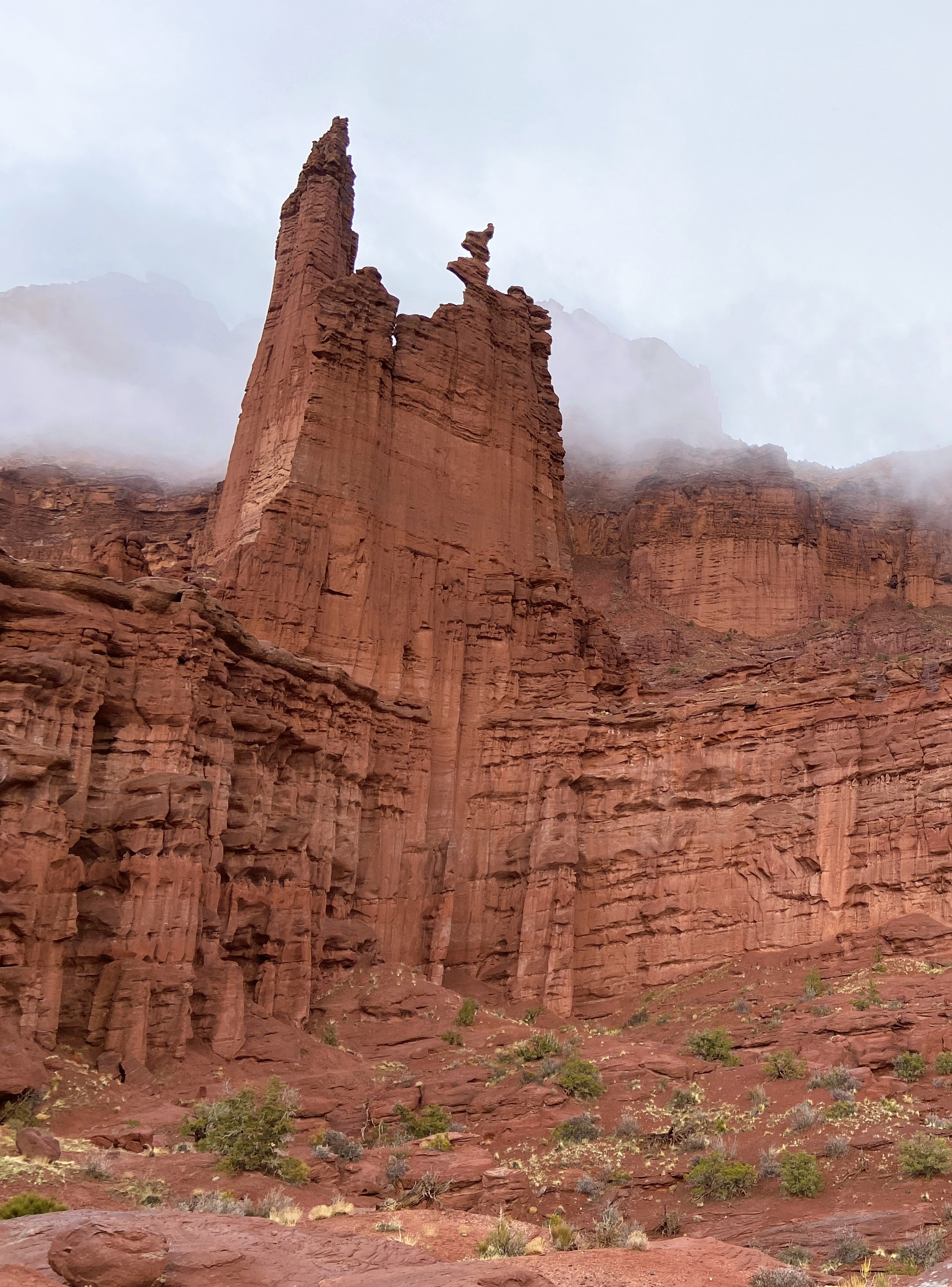
Kingfisher and Ancient Art

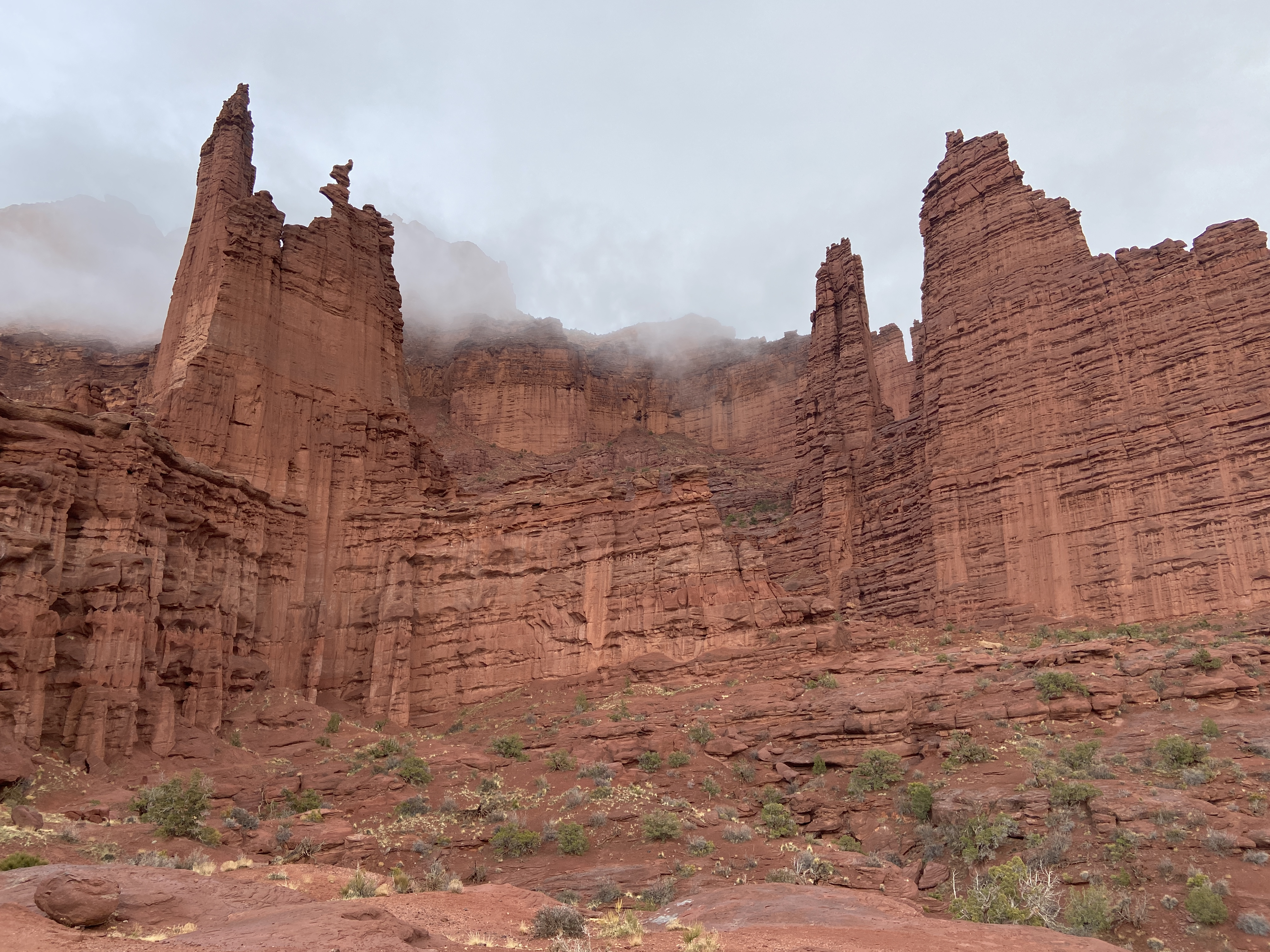
Kingfisher/Ancient Art to left, Cottontail to right

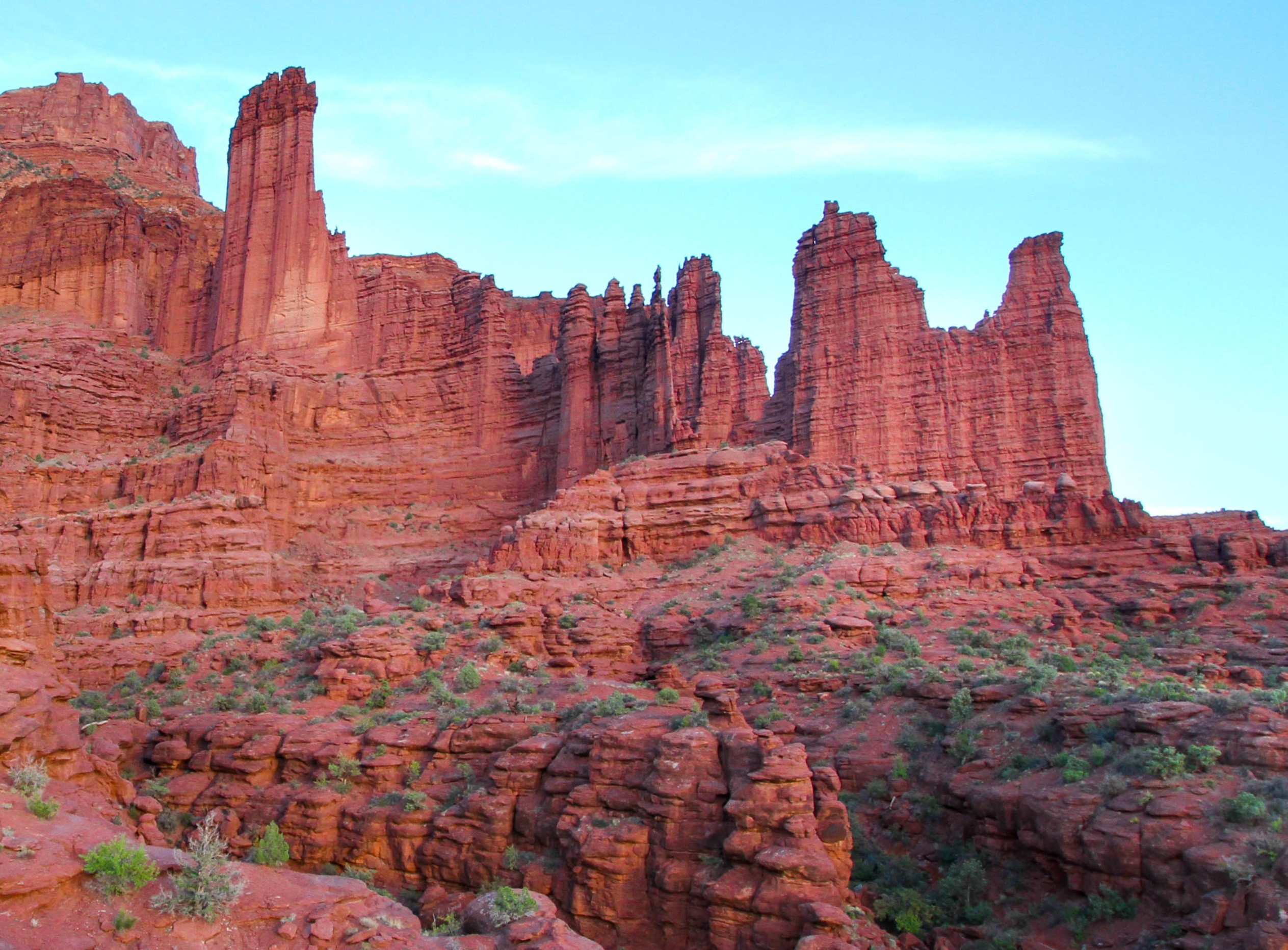
Fisher Towers L→R: Kingfisher, Ancient Art, Cottontail, Titan.

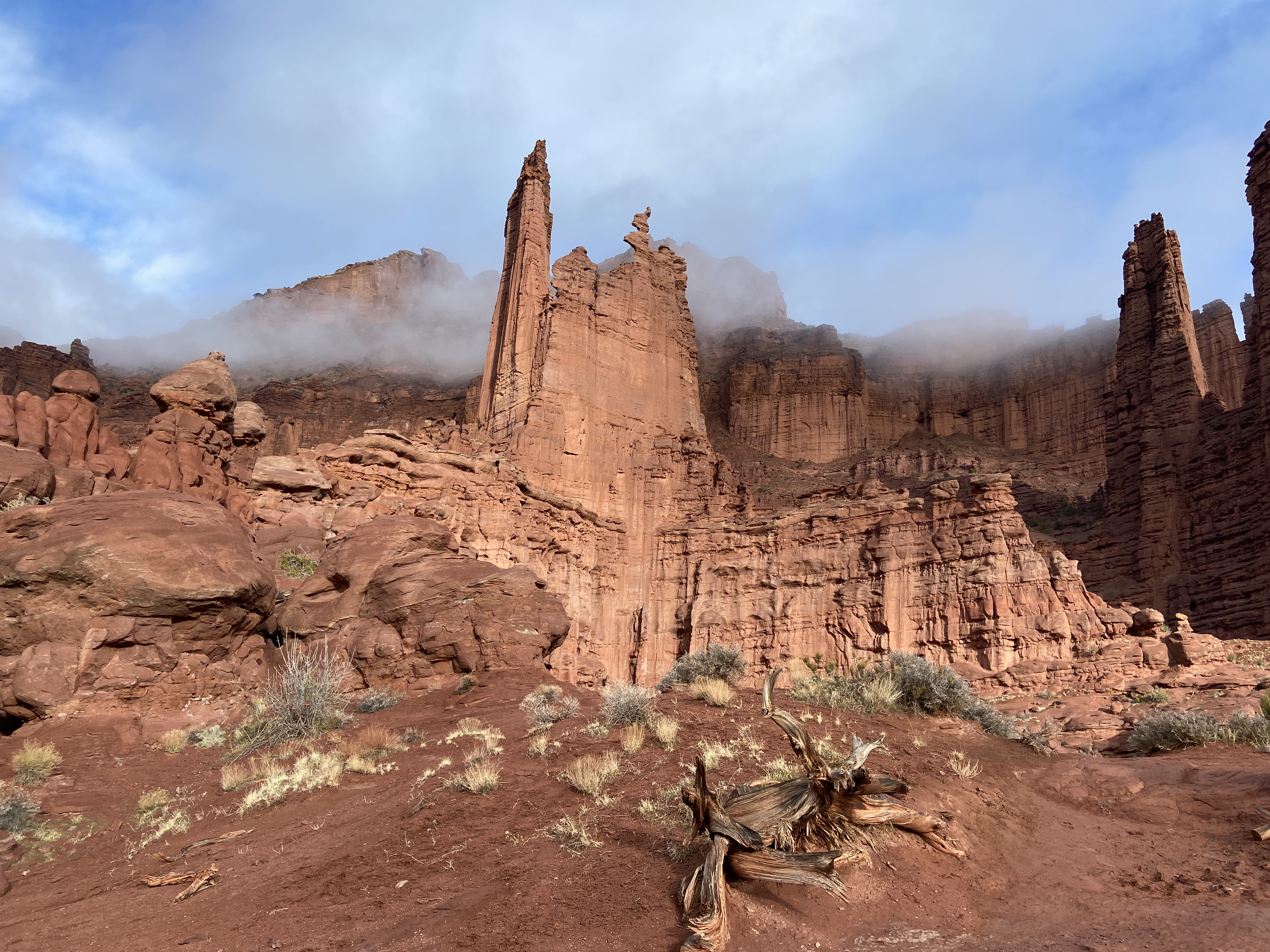
Kingfisher and Ancient Art

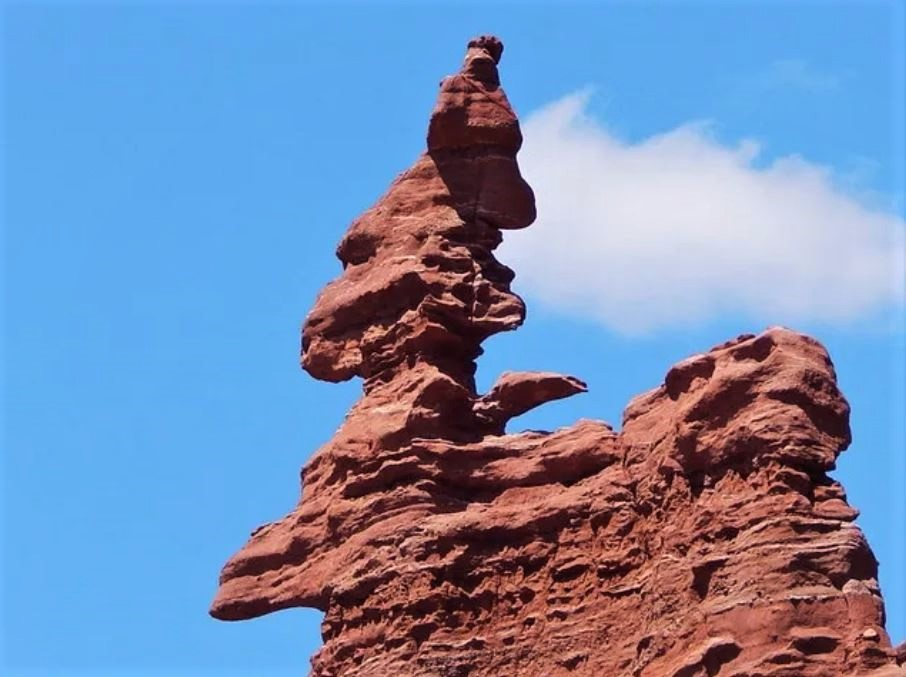
The Corkscrew summit

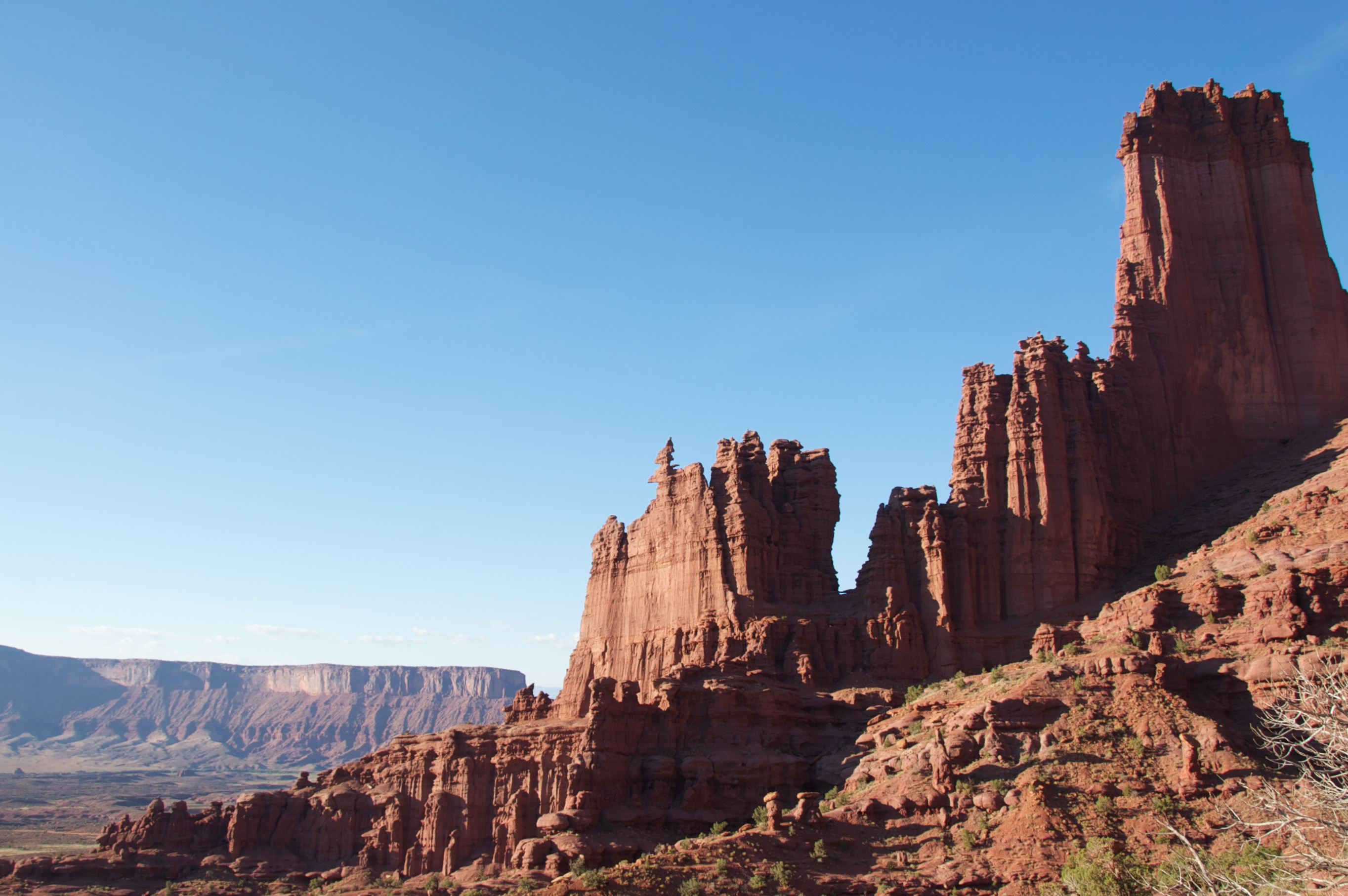
South aspect of Ancient Art centered, Kingfisher upper right

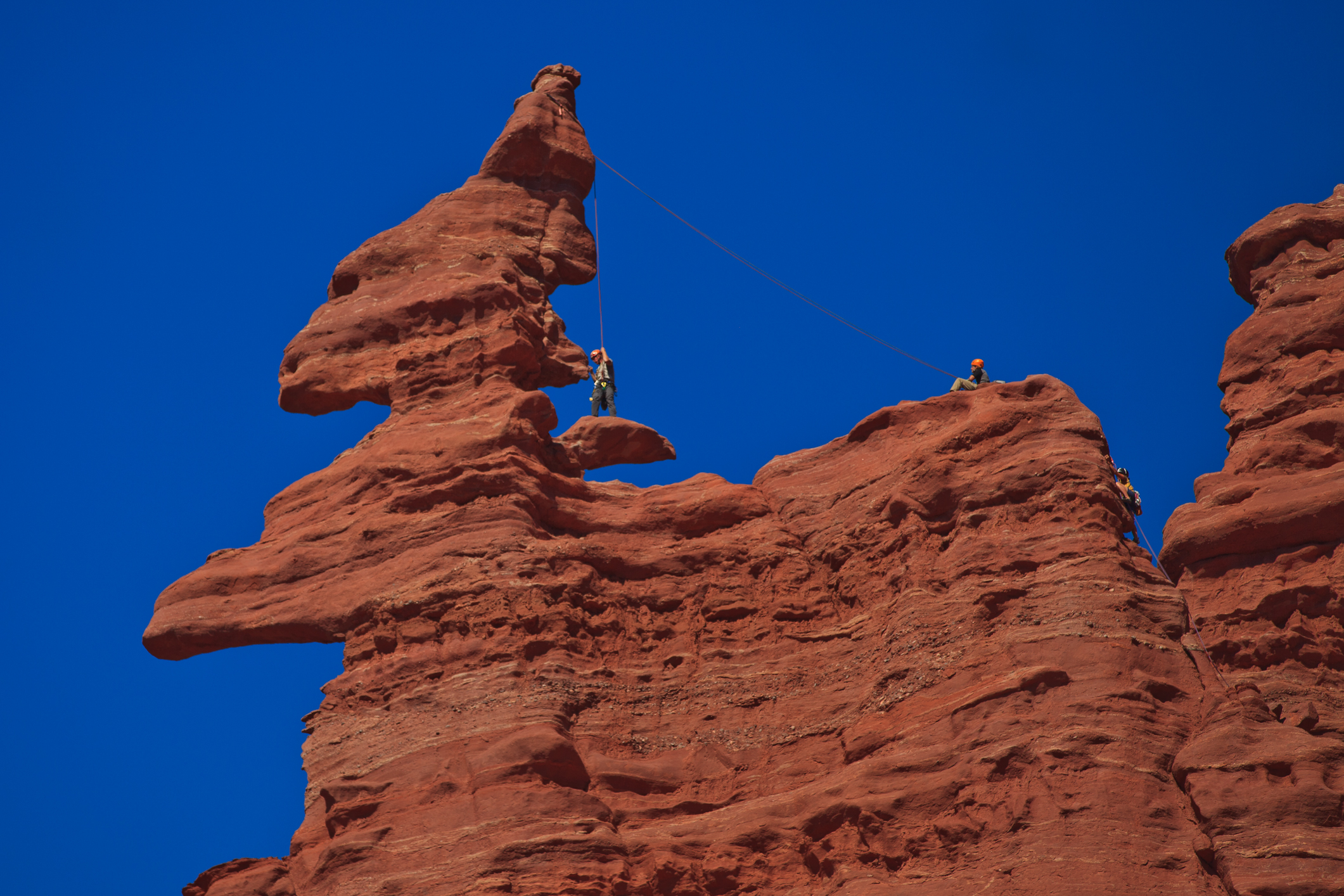

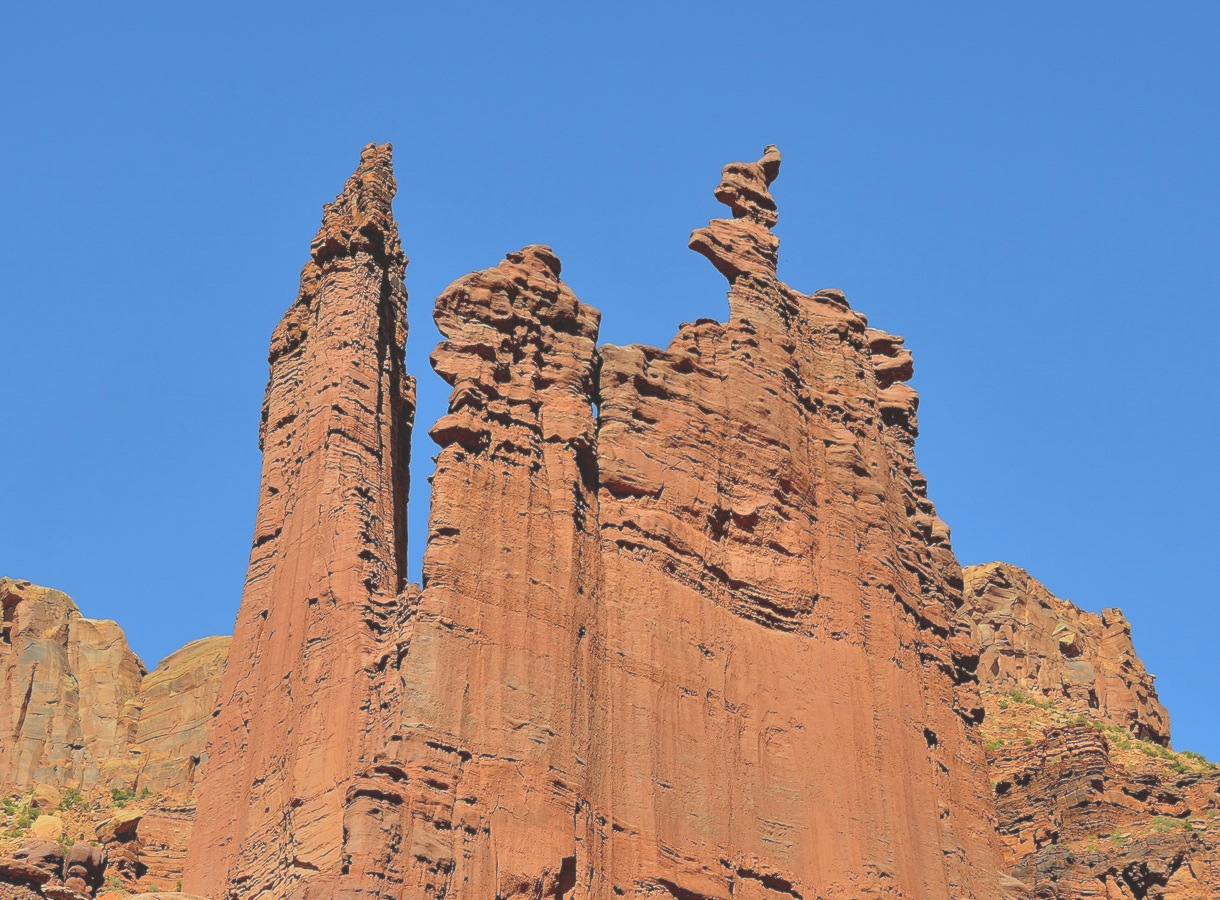
Kingfisher (L) and Ancient Art (R)

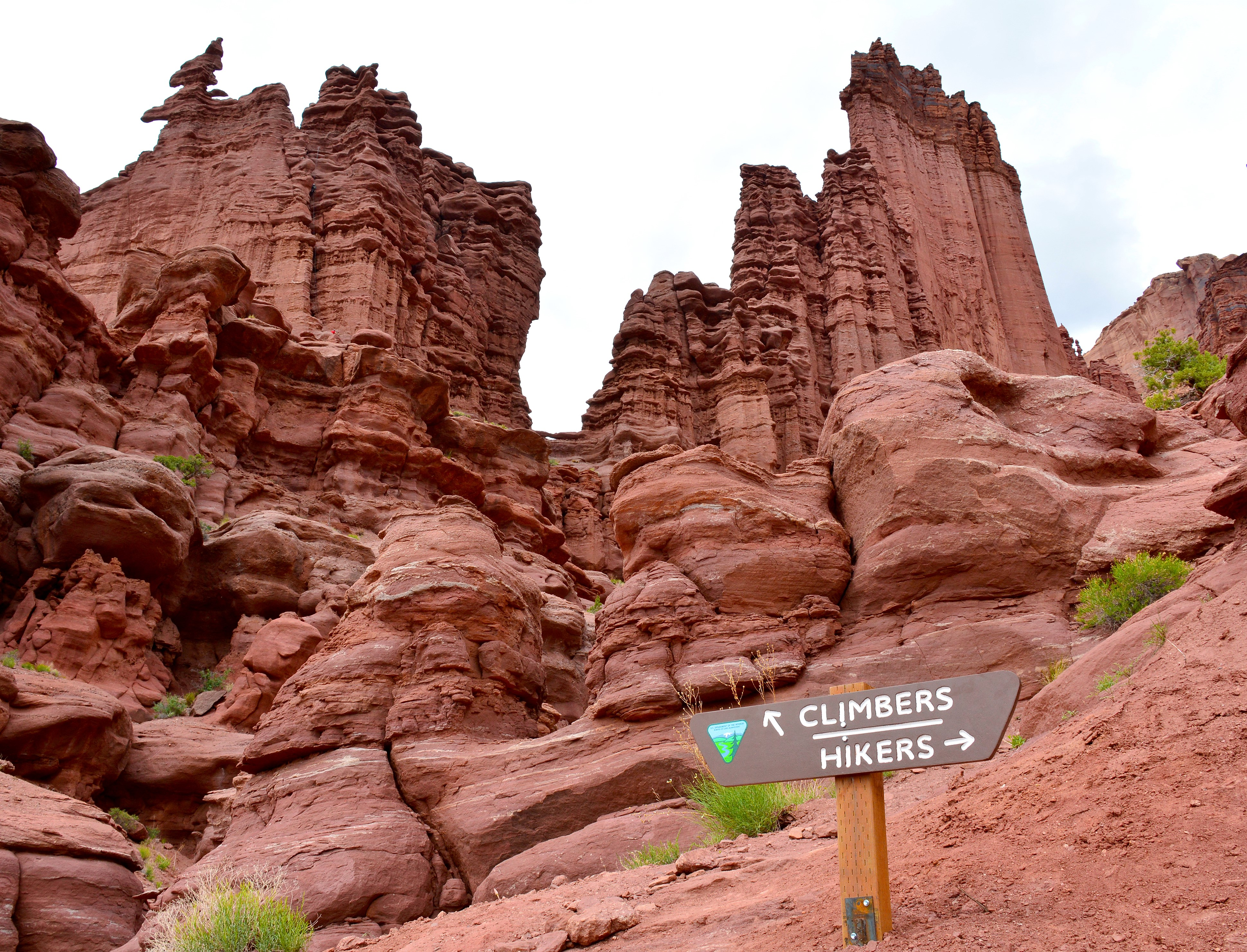
Climbers' access to Ancient Art (left) and Kingfisher Tower (right) from Fisher Towers Trail

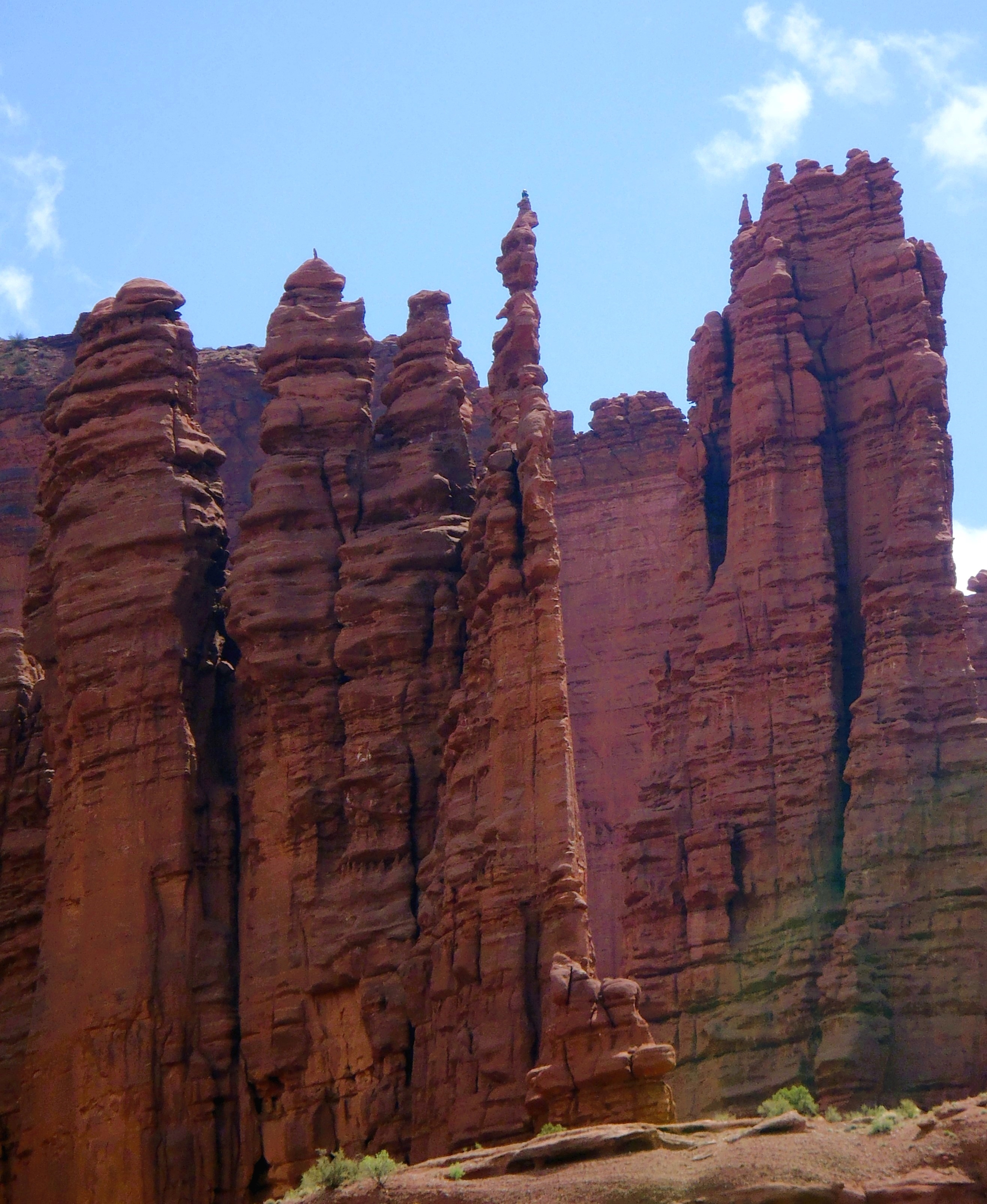
Ancient Art (left) and Echo Tower (right)

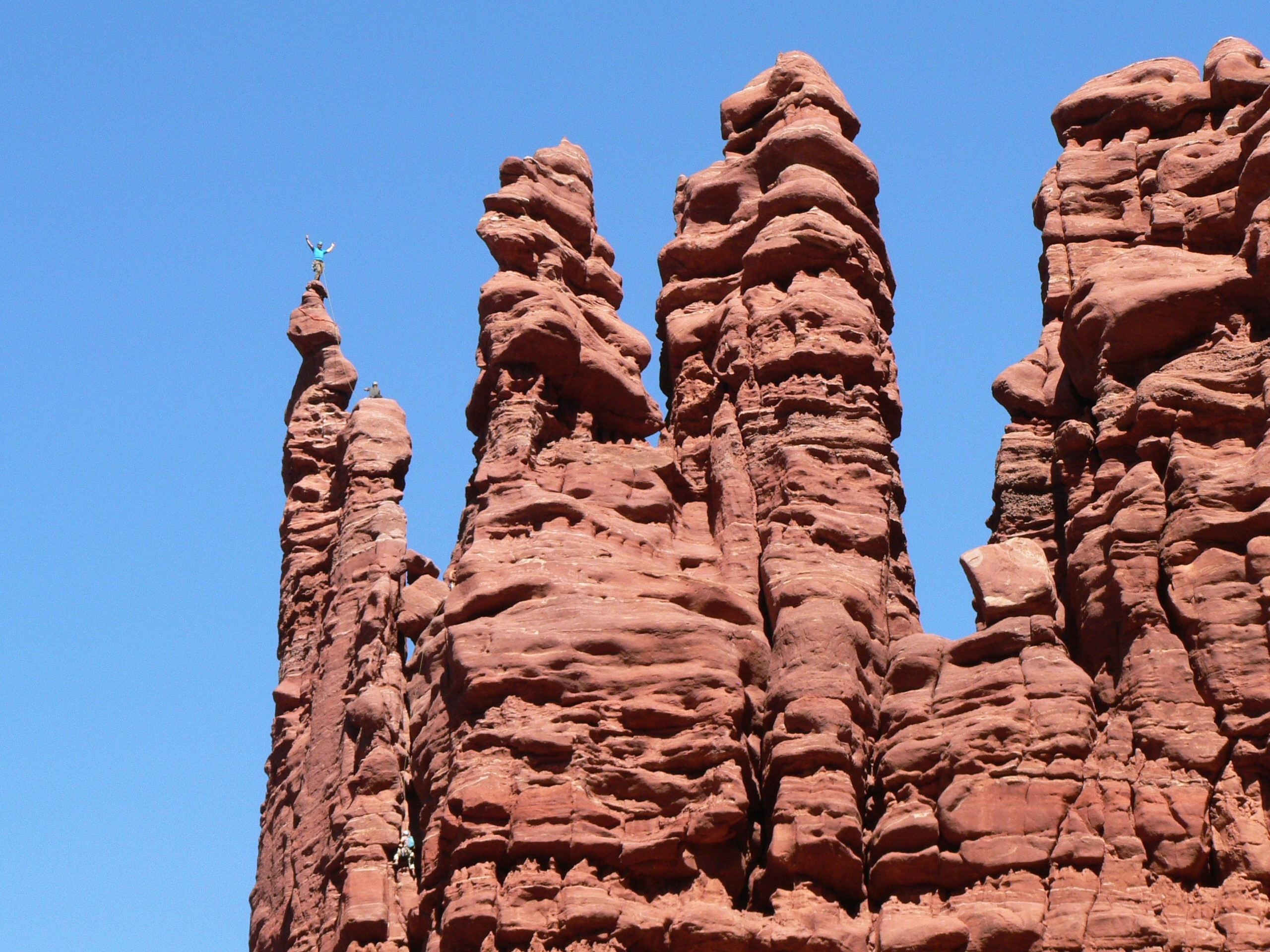
Note the three climbers - on the summit of Corkscrew Summit, belaying, and below in the "Stolen Chimney" route.
