= Stolen Chimney =

Traditional climbing route in the Fisher Towers, US

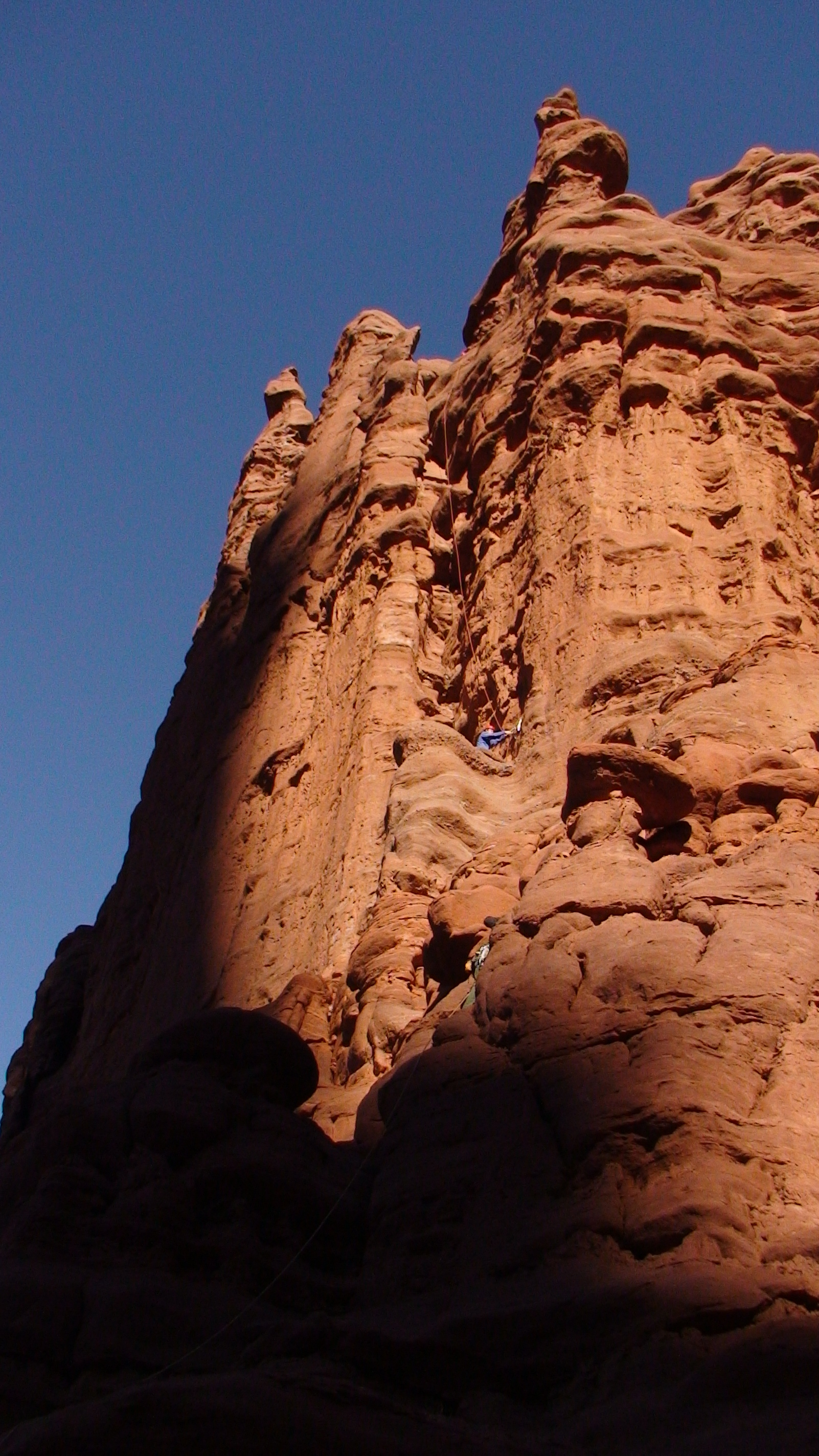
- The Stolen Chimney route on Ancient Art Tower, Fisher Towers near Moab, Utah.
- Location: Moab, Utah, USA
- Coordinates: 38.7216°N 109.3040°W
- Climbing area: Ancient Arts, Fisher Towers
- Route type: Trad
- Vertical gain: 500 feet (150 m)
- Pitches: 5
- Technical grade: 5.10d or 5.8 & A0
- NCCS grade: II
- First ascent: Bill Roos & Paul Sibley, 1969.

The Stolen Chimney is a traditional multi-pitch climbing route located on the Ancient Arts tower of one of the Fisher Towers. This is the most common routes used to ascend the "corkscrew" summit of the tower (the final fourth pitch). The corkscrew summit is the westernmost summit of the Ancient Art tower but it is not the tallest. The summit is noteworthy for its unusual shape which makes the climbing experience very different from most other climbs. The unusual shape is also visually striking. Photographs of the corkscrew summit have been extensively published in many settings including mainstream advertisements.

The name of this multi-pitch route, Stolen Chimney, is often confused with the name of the tower it is on, Ancient Arts, and the name of the final summit pitch, the corkscrew. This is likely because this is by far the most popular climb on Ancient Arts and is predominantly known for the corkscrew summit.

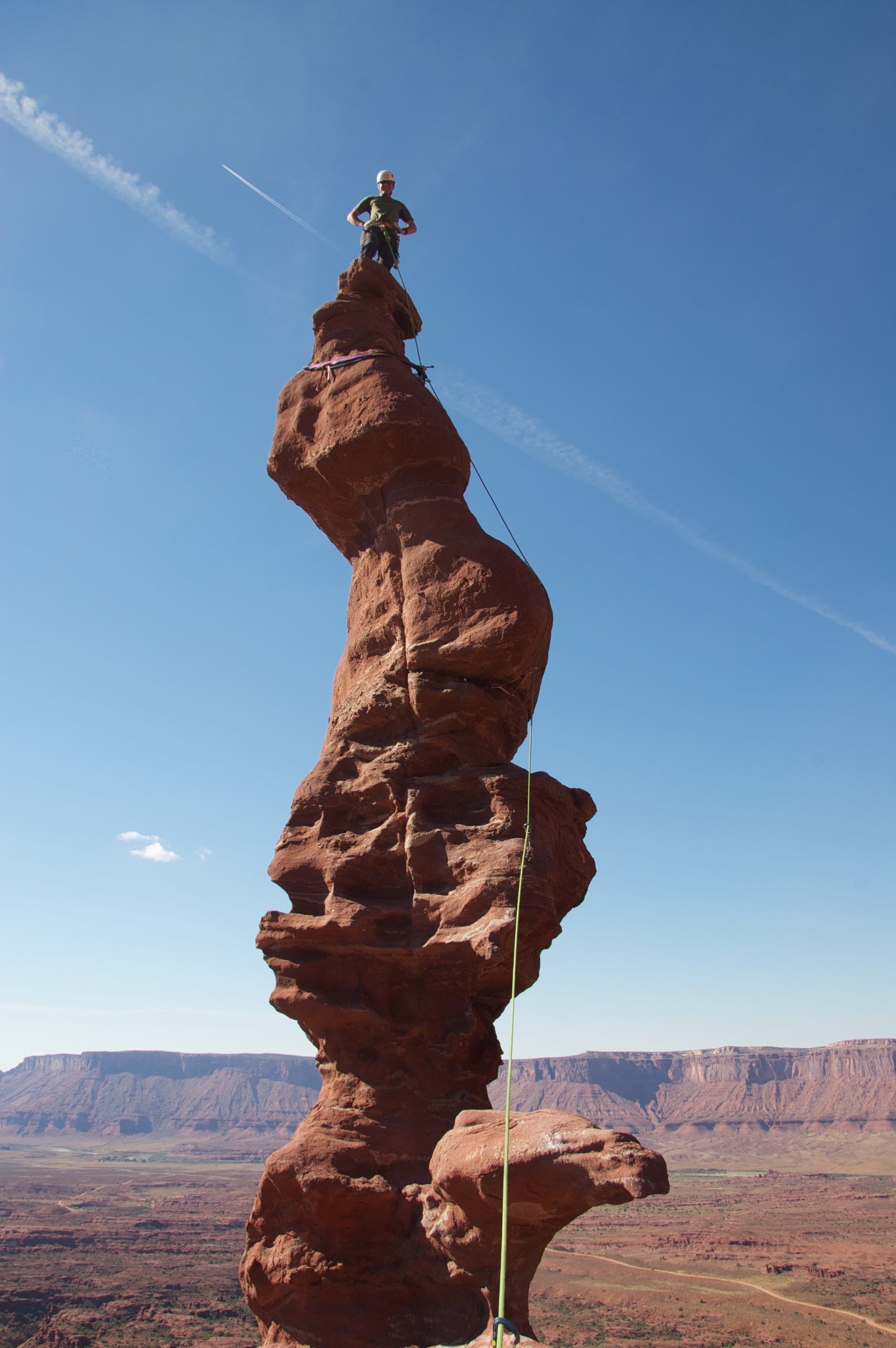
Climber on top of the "corkscrew", the 4th pitch of Stolen Chimney
