= Fisher Towers =

Mountain in Grand County, Utah, United States

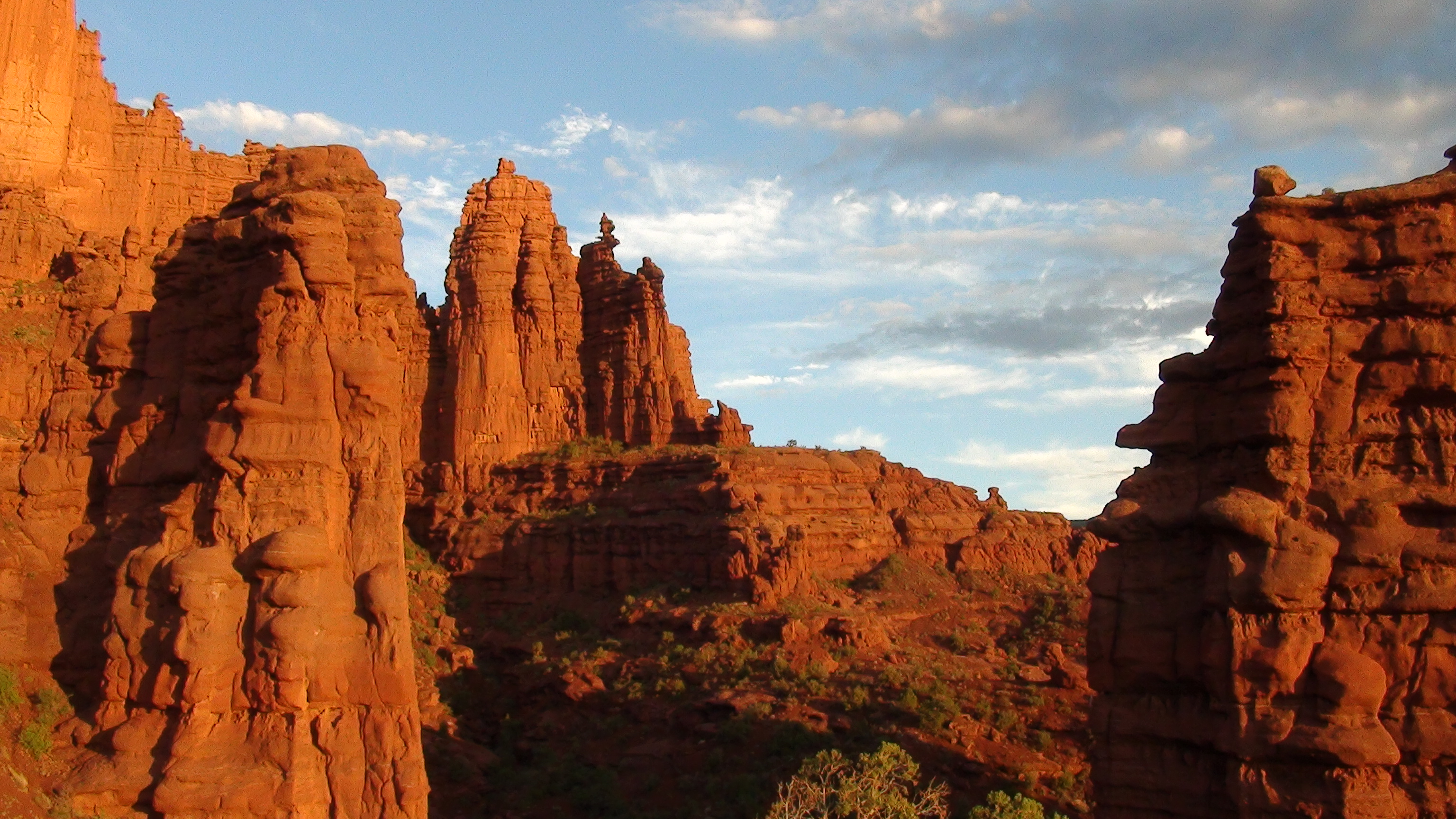
- The Fisher Towers viewed from the west at sundown

- Location within Utah
- Nearest city: Moab, Utah
- Coordinates: 38°43′18″N 109°18′15″W
- Type of climbing: Traditional climbing; Aid climbing; Face climbing
- Height range: Titan: 900 feet (270 m); Ancient Art: 400 feet (120 m)
- Pitches range: Up to 7
- Technical grades: Many hard routes from 5.8 to 5.11; very hard aid climbing up to A5
- NCCS grades: Up to IV
- Rock type: Cutler sandstone capped with Moenkopi sandstone and caked with a stucco of red mud
- Quantity of routes: Over 70 routes in the online databases
- Climbing area developed: Partially developed with new routes opportunities
- Cliff aspect: South facing
- Season: Fall and Spring
- Ownership: Bureau of Land Management
- Camping: Free
- Guidebook: Moab Climbs: High on Moab (2nd Edition)
- Classic climbs: Stolen Chimney (5.10d or 5.8 A0) on Ancient Art; Finger of Fate (5.8 A3) on Titan; The Colorado North East Ridge (A3) on Kingfisher; West Side Story (A3) on Cottontail Tower; Phantom Sprint (5.12b or A3) on Echo Tower; Sundevil Chimney (5.8 A4) on Titan
- Stars: 4/5 stars

Fisher Towers are a series of towers made of Cutler sandstone capped with Moenkopi sandstone and caked with a stucco of red mud located near Moab, Utah (38.7240°N 109.3083°W). The Towers are named for a miner who lived near them in the 1880s. The Towers are world-renowned as a subject for photography and for its classic rock climbing routes.

== Location ==
The nearest town is Moab, Utah about 16 miles (26 km) to the southwest. The area is generally accessed from Fisher Towers Road off of Route 128 which runs along the Colorado River between I-70 and Route 191. Castleton Tower is visible approximately 6 miles (9.7 km) to the southwest from different parts of the Fisher Tower's area.

The Towers lie just south of a larger mesa which they are emerging from on a geological time scale. 1,000 feet (300 m) north of the main formation there is a tower which has only partway emerged from the mesa. The Towers are composed of three major fins of rock that run from the northeast closer to the mesa out to the southwest and into a desert valley. The fins are between 1,000 and 2,000 feet (300 and 610 m) long and separated from each other by about 1,000 feet (300 m). Each fin contains multiple towers, a number of which have been named.

The easternmost section of the northernmost fin is dominated by a tower known as the King Fisher. The ridge line of the fin drops considerable before reaching the western formation called Ancient Art. Ancient Art is composed of four separate summits the most striking of which is the cork screw summit. The Middle fin is split into two very distinct towers known as Echo Tower in the east and Cottontail in the west. The southernmost fin is best known for containing the Fisher Towers with the greatest elevation and prominence, a structure named Titan Tower. The eastern portion of the southern fin is the less well known Oracle which physically connects back to the mesa.

The area has many other named structures, such as the Cobra (which collapsed, presumably due to a lightning strike, sometime in the final week of July 2014) and the Sundial, both found in between King Fisher and Echo Tower. Each consists of balanced rocks perched above smaller supports. Another example is the Lizard Rock, a 60-foot (18 m) tower near the parking lot.

== Rock climbing ==
Development of Fisher Towers as climbing areas start in the early 1960s. The first notable technical climb was a route called the Finger of Fate, which summits Titan Tower and was later featured in Fifty Classic Climbs of North America. The Towers are also very well known for the cork screw summit of the Ancient Arts tower, most commonly accessed by the Stolen Chimney route. Photographs of the unusual cork screw summit have been extensively published in many settings including mainstream advertisements.

== In film ==
The Fisher Towers were featured in the opening scene of Austin Powers in Goldmember.

Television commercials, advertisements, and even scenes from famous movies have been filmed in the area of Moab, Utah (where the Fisher Towers are located).

== Gallery ==
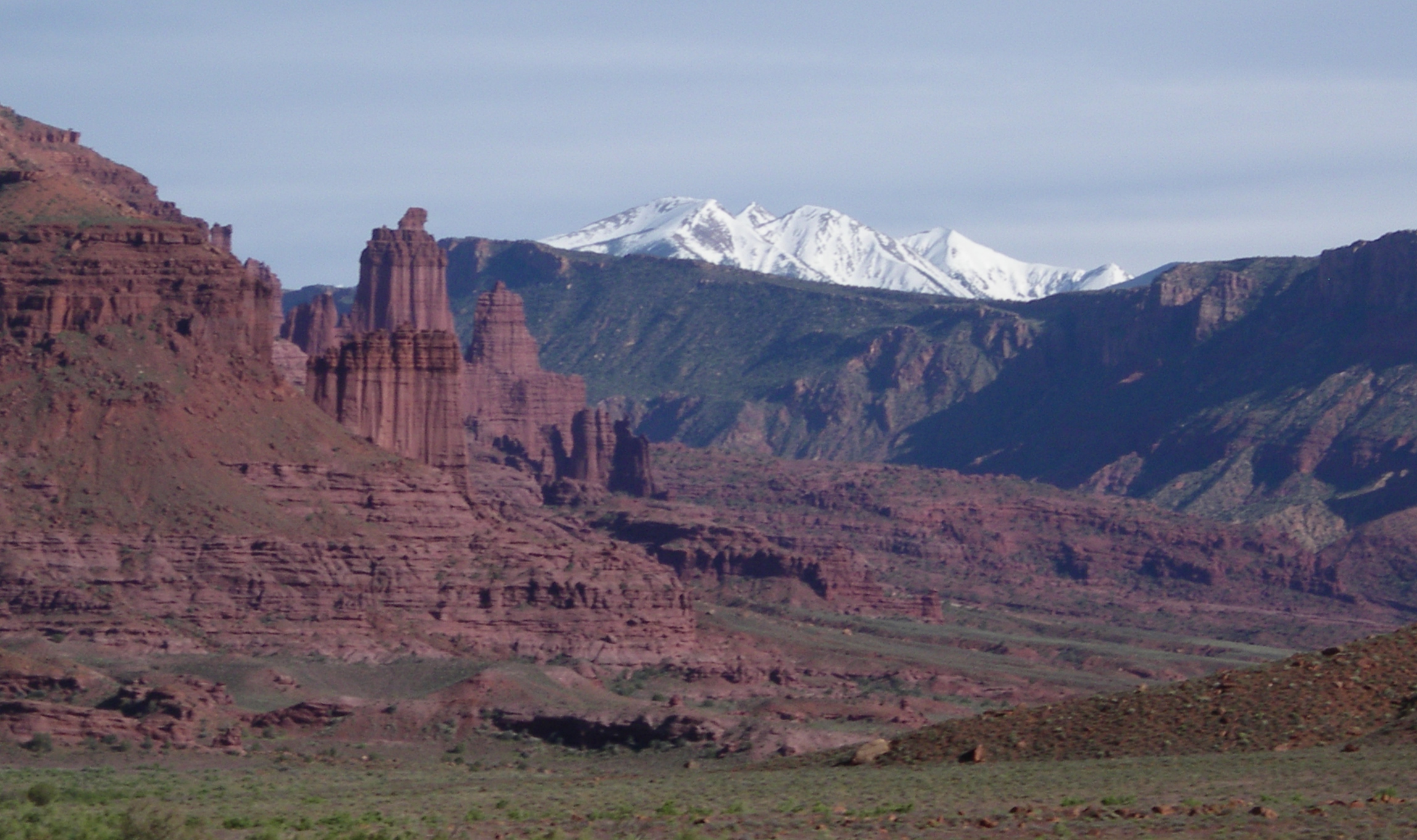
View from the north with the La Sal Range in the distance

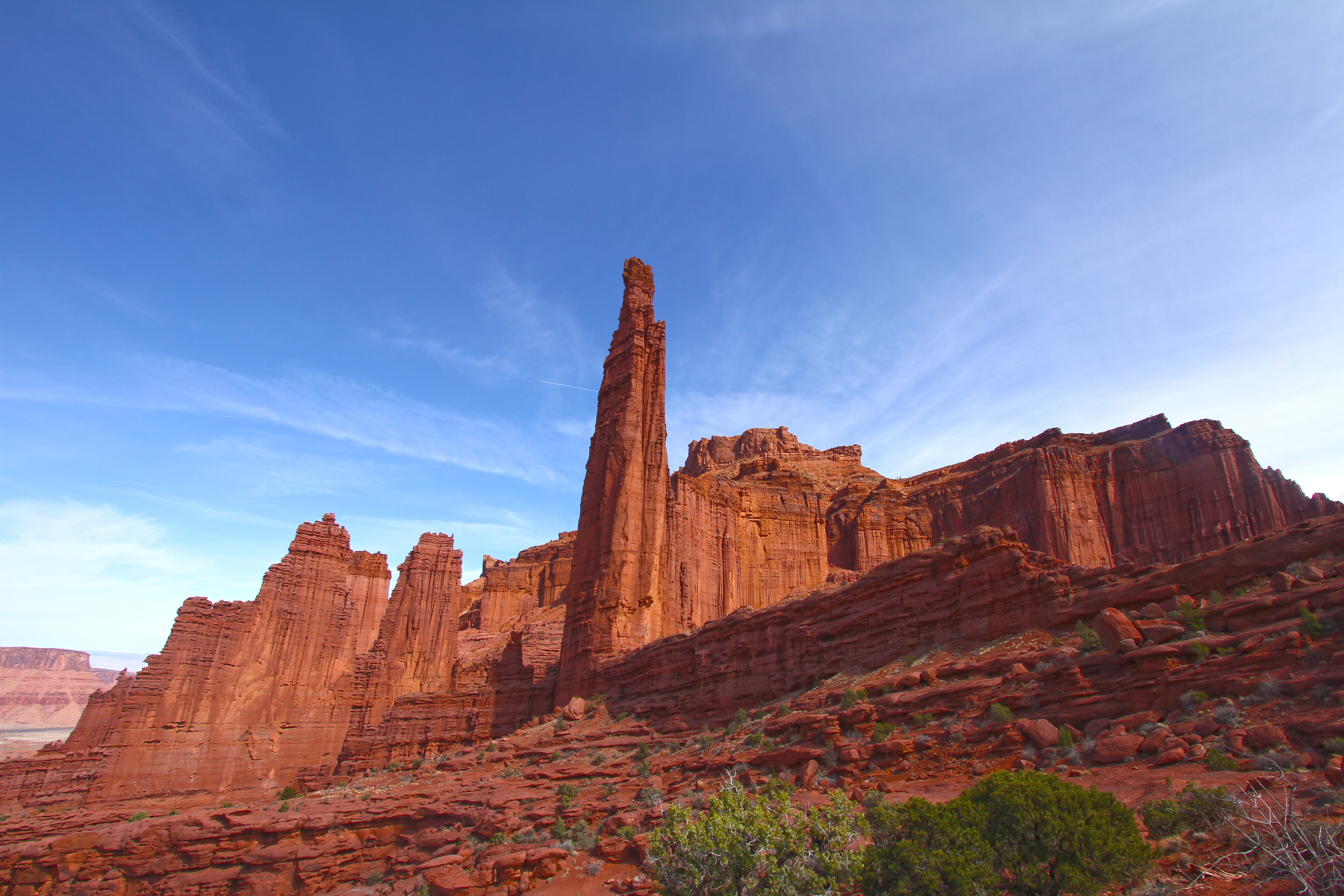
The Titan

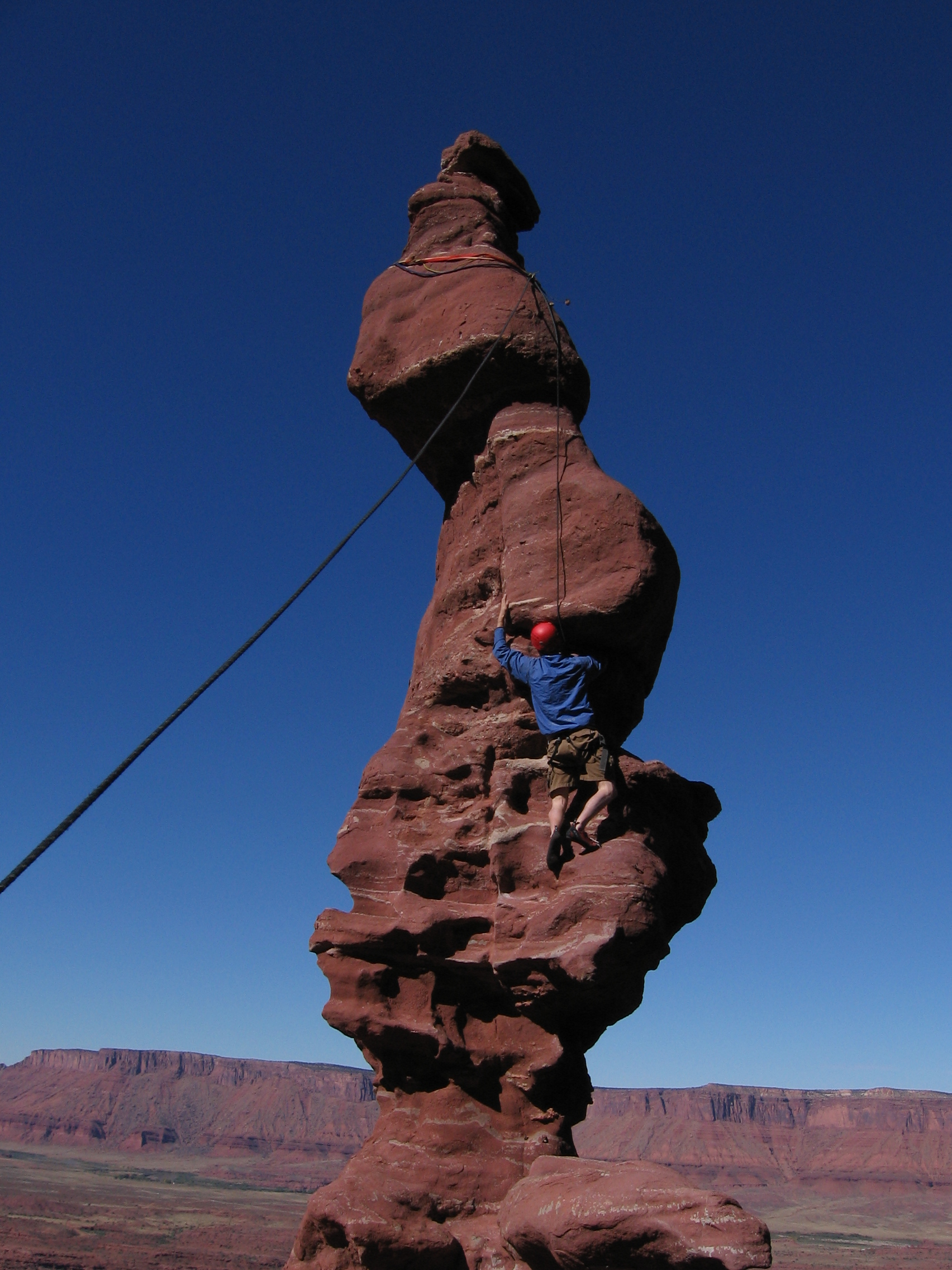
Climber ascends the Corkscrew pitch on Stolen Chimney

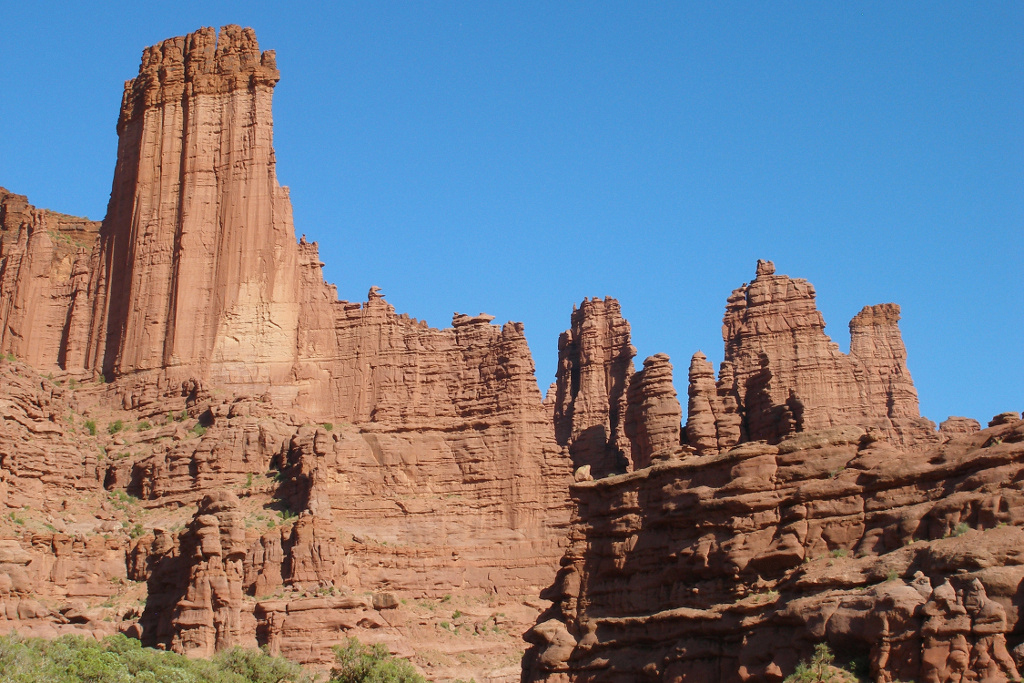
View from the northwest, Kingfisher to left

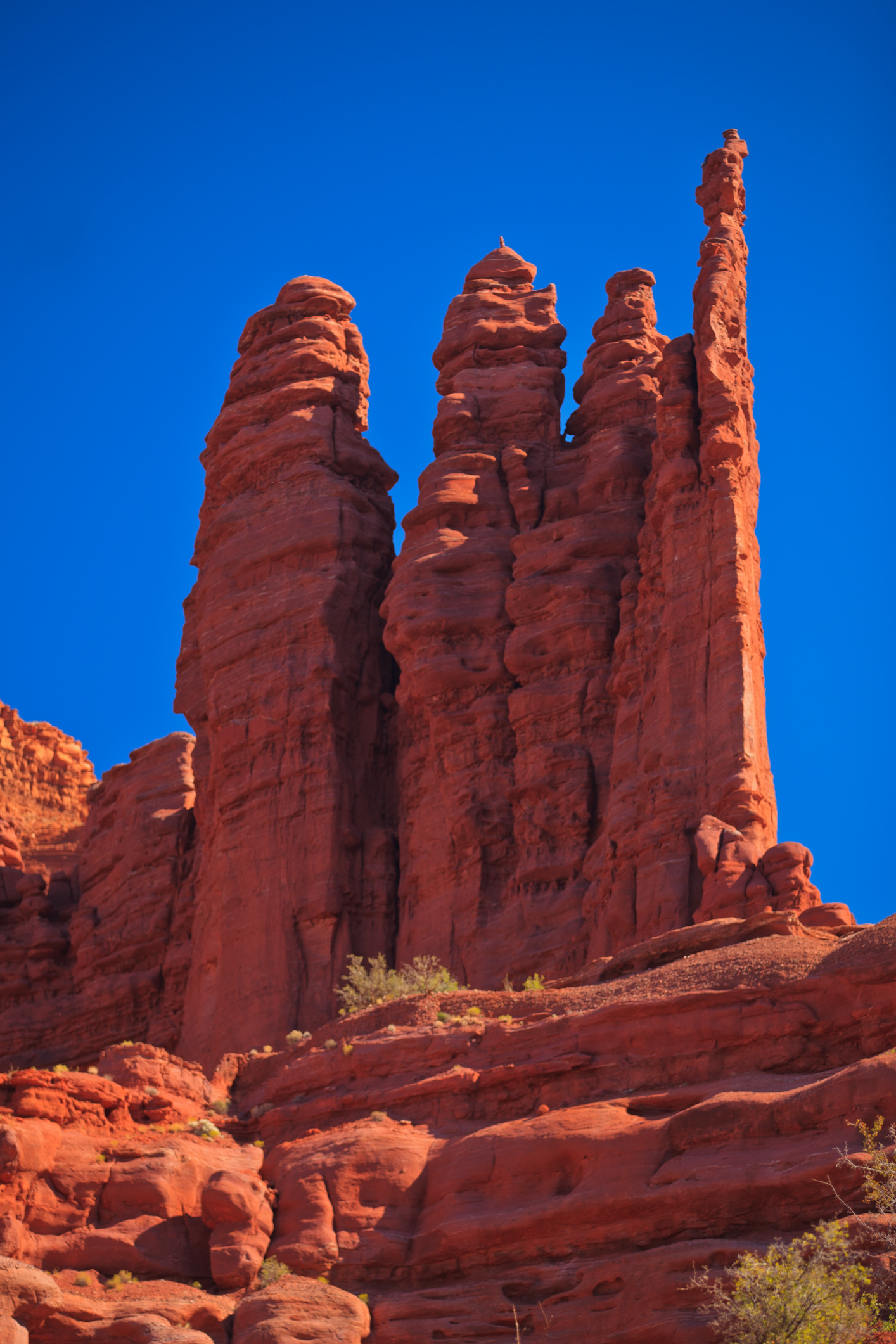
Ancient Art

== Guidebooks ==
- Bjørnstad, Eric (1999). Rock climbing desert rock III : Moab to Colorado National Monument. Helena, MO: Falcon. ISBN 1-56044-754-0.
- Knapp, Fred (2002). Classic Desert Climbs (2nd ed.). Sharp End Publishing. ISBN 1-892540-17-7.
- Green, Stewart M. (1998). Rock climbing Utah. Helena, Mont.: Falcon. ISBN 1560445947.
