= The Oracle (Fisher Towers) =

6,060 ft sandstone tower in Utah

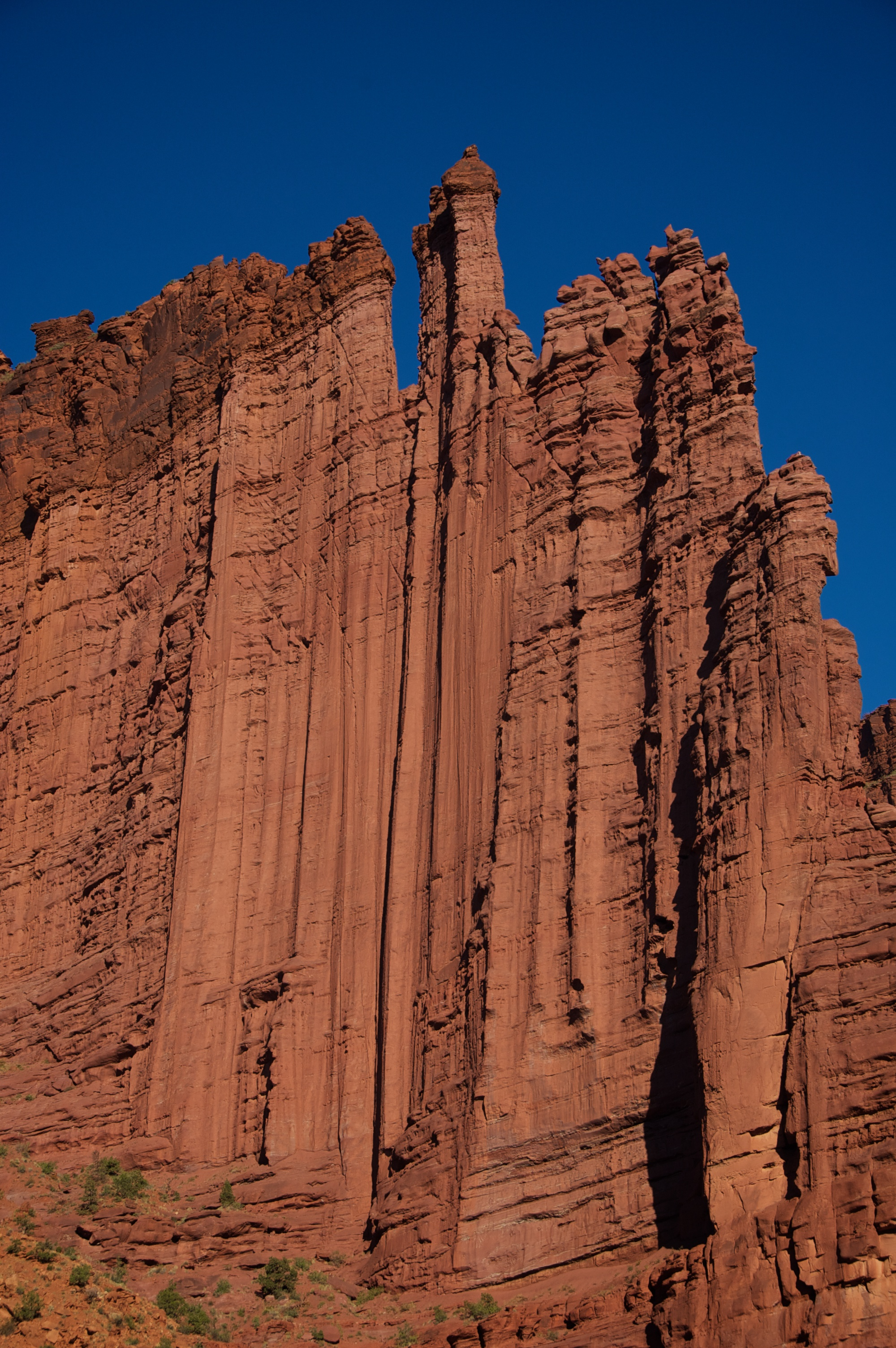
- Northwest aspect

Highest point
- Elevation: 6,060 ft (1,847 m)
- Prominence: 120 ft (37 m)
- Parent peak: The Titan
- Isolation: 0.15 mi (0.24 km)
- Coordinates: 38°43′15″N 109°17′49″W

Geography
- Location within Utah Location within the United States
- Country: United States
- State: Utah
- County: Grand
- Parent range: Colorado Plateau
- Topo map: USGS Fisher Towers

Geology
- Mountain type: Pillar
- Rock type: Sandstone

Climbing
- First ascent: 1970
- Easiest route: class 5.8

The Oracle is a 6,060-foot-elevation (1,847-meter) pillar in Grand County, Utah, United States.

== Description ==
The Oracle is located 17 miles (27 km) northeast of Moab, Utah, in the Fisher Towers, on land administered by the Bureau of Land Management. Topographic relief is significant as the summit rises over 1,000 feet (305 meters) above surrounding terrain in 0.1 miles (0.16 km). Precipitation runoff from the tower drains to Onion Creek which empties into the Colorado River, approximately three miles to the west. Access is via Fisher Towers Road from Route 128 and hiking the Fisher Towers Trail.

== Geology ==
The Oracle is set on a fin and is composed of two principal strata of sandstone and mudstone: Permian Cutler Formation capped by Early Triassic Moenkopi Formation. There is an unconformity between the Cutler and the Moenkopi layers. The reddish coloration of the rock is a result of varying amounts of hematite.

== Climate ==
Spring and fall are the most favorable seasons to visit The Oracle. According to the Köppen climate classification system, it is located in a cold semi-arid climate zone with cold winters and hot summers. Summers highs rarely exceed 100 °F (38 °C). Summer nights are comfortably cool, and temperatures drop quickly after sunset. Winters are cold, but daytime highs are usually above freezing. Winter temperatures below 0 °F (−18 °C) are uncommon, though possible. This desert climate receives less than 10 inches (250 millimeters) of annual rainfall, and snowfall is generally light during the winter.

== Climbing ==
The first ascent of the summit was made in 1970 by Harvey T. Carter Tom Merrill, Steve Kentz, and Mike Pokress via the class 5.10 Fantasia route on the south ridge.

Other rock-climbing routes on The Oracle:

- Beaking In Tongues – class 5.8 – Steve Bartlett, Dave Levine – (1997)
- Beak to the Future – class 5.10 – Paul Gagner, Jeremy Aslaksen – (2012)
- Empire of Dirt – class 5.8 – Jeremy Aslaksen – (2019)
- Curse the Gods – Jim Beyer – (2021)

== See also ==
- Fisher Towers
