= Kingfisher Tower (Utah) =

Sandstone pillar in Grand County, Utah, USA

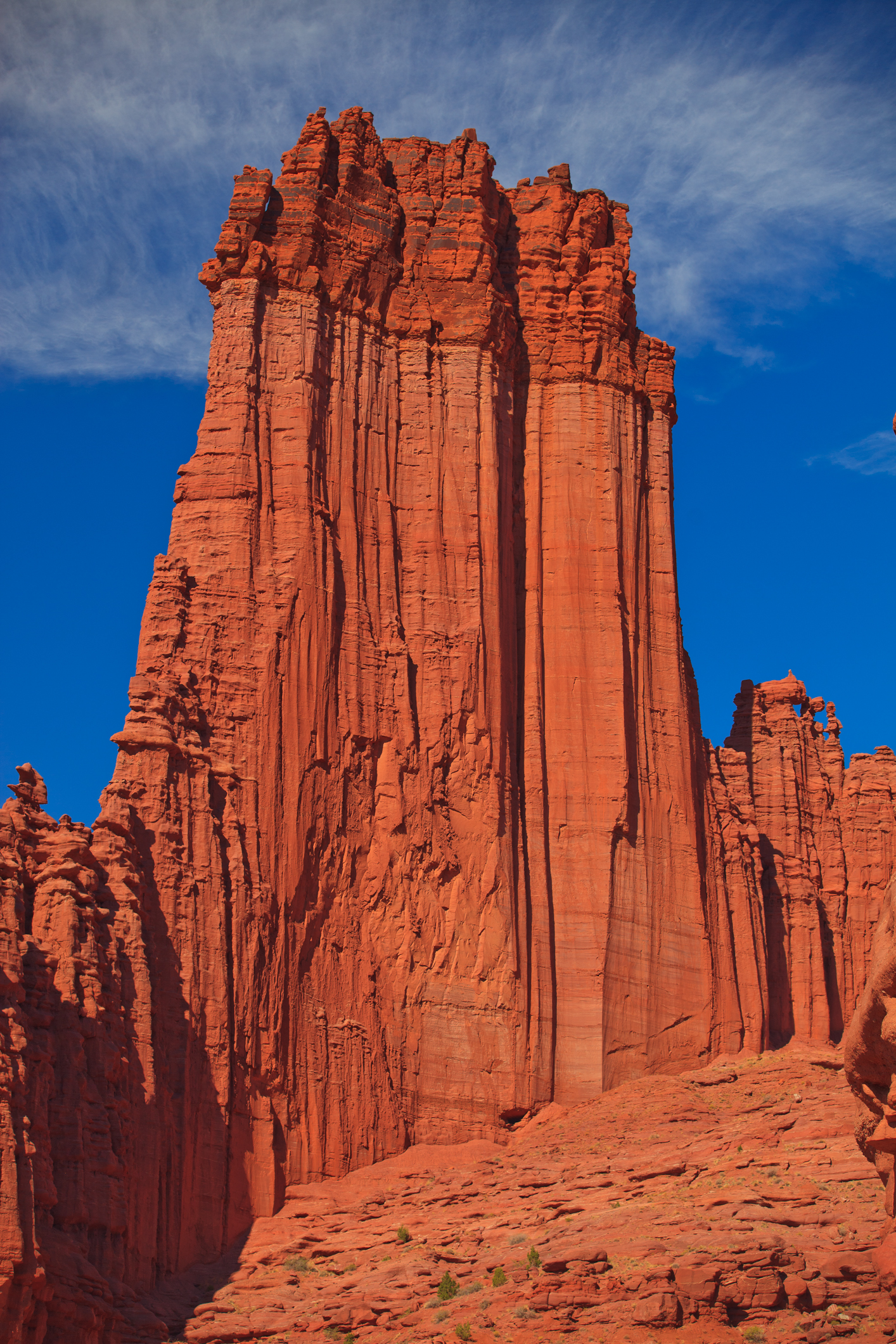
- South aspect

Highest point
- Elevation: 6,794 ft (2,071 m)
- Prominence: 520 ft (158 m)
- Parent peak: The Titan
- Isolation: 0.40 mi (0.64 km)
- Coordinates: 38°43′23″N 109°18′04″W

Geography
- Location within Utah Location within the United States
- Country: United States
- State: Utah
- County: Grand
- Parent range: Colorado Plateau
- Topo map: USGS Fisher Towers

Geology
- Mountain type: Pillar
- Rock type: Sandstone

Climbing
- First ascent: 1962
- Easiest route: class 5.8 Northeast Ridge

Kingfisher Tower is a 6,794-foot-elevation (2,071-meter) pillar in Grand County, Utah, United States.

== Description ==
Kingfisher Tower is located 17 miles (27 km) northeast of Moab, Utah, on land administered by the Bureau of Land Management. Kingfisher is the second-highest peak in the Fisher Towers, and it ranks as the 14th-steepest peak in the United States. Topographic relief is significant as the summit rises nearly 600 feet (183 meters) above the tower's base, and over 2,000 feet (610 meters) above the Fisher Towers Campground in 0.4 miles (0.64 km). Precipitation runoff from the tower drains to Onion Creek which empties into the Colorado River, approximately three miles to the west. Access is via Fisher Towers Road from Route 128.

== Geology ==
Kingfisher Tower is set on a fin and is composed of two principal strata of sandstone and mudstone: Permian Cutler Formation capped by Early Triassic Moenkopi Formation. There is an unconformity between the Cutler and the Moenkopi layers.

== Climate ==
Spring and fall are the most favorable seasons to visit Kingfisher Tower. According to the Köppen climate classification system, it is located in a cold semi-arid climate zone with cold winters and hot summers. Summers highs rarely exceed 100 °F (38 °C). Summer nights are comfortably cool, and temperatures drop quickly after sunset. Winters are cold, but daytime highs are usually above freezing. Winter temperatures below 0 °F (−18 °C) are uncommon, though possible. This desert climate receives less than 10 inches (250 millimeters) of annual rainfall, and snowfall is generally light during the winter.

== Climbing ==
The first ascent of the summit was made May 27–31, 1962, by Harvey T. Carter and Cleve McCarty via the class 5.8 Northeast Ridge.

Rock climbing routes on Kingfisher Tower:

- Jagged Edge - class 5.9 - Jim Beyer (1980s)
- Death Of American Democracy - class 5.10 - Jim Beyer (1980s)
- Weird Science - Paul Gagner, Jeremy Aslaksen (2009)
- Thermic Fever - class 5.9+ - Jeremy Aslaksen, Joe Forrester (2021)
- The Return of Mudzilla

== See also ==
- Fisher Towers
- Titan Tower

== Gallery ==
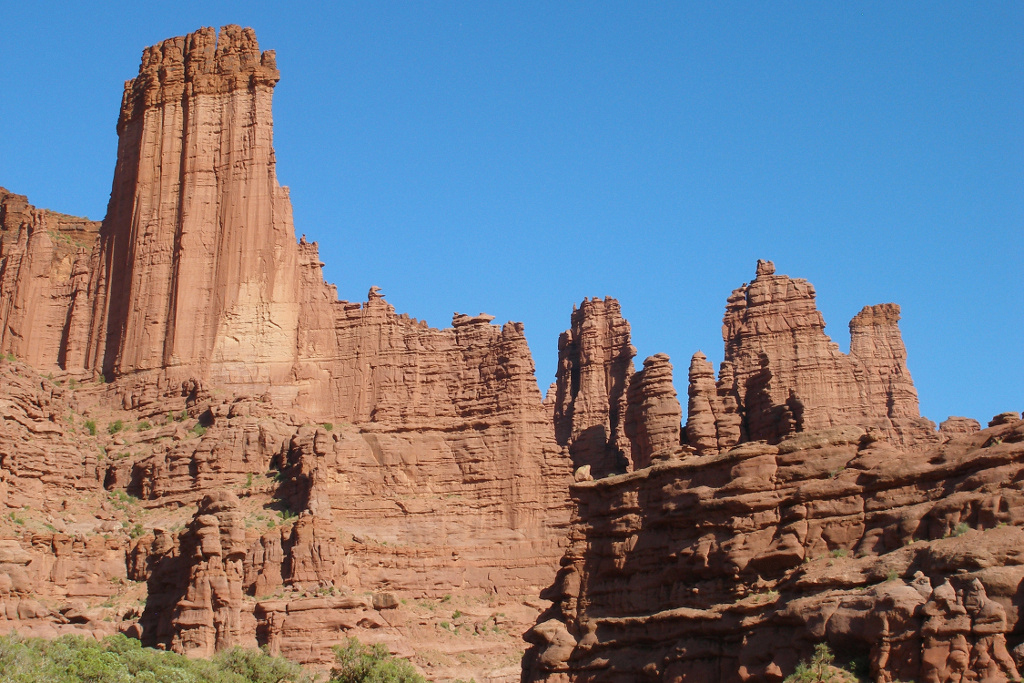

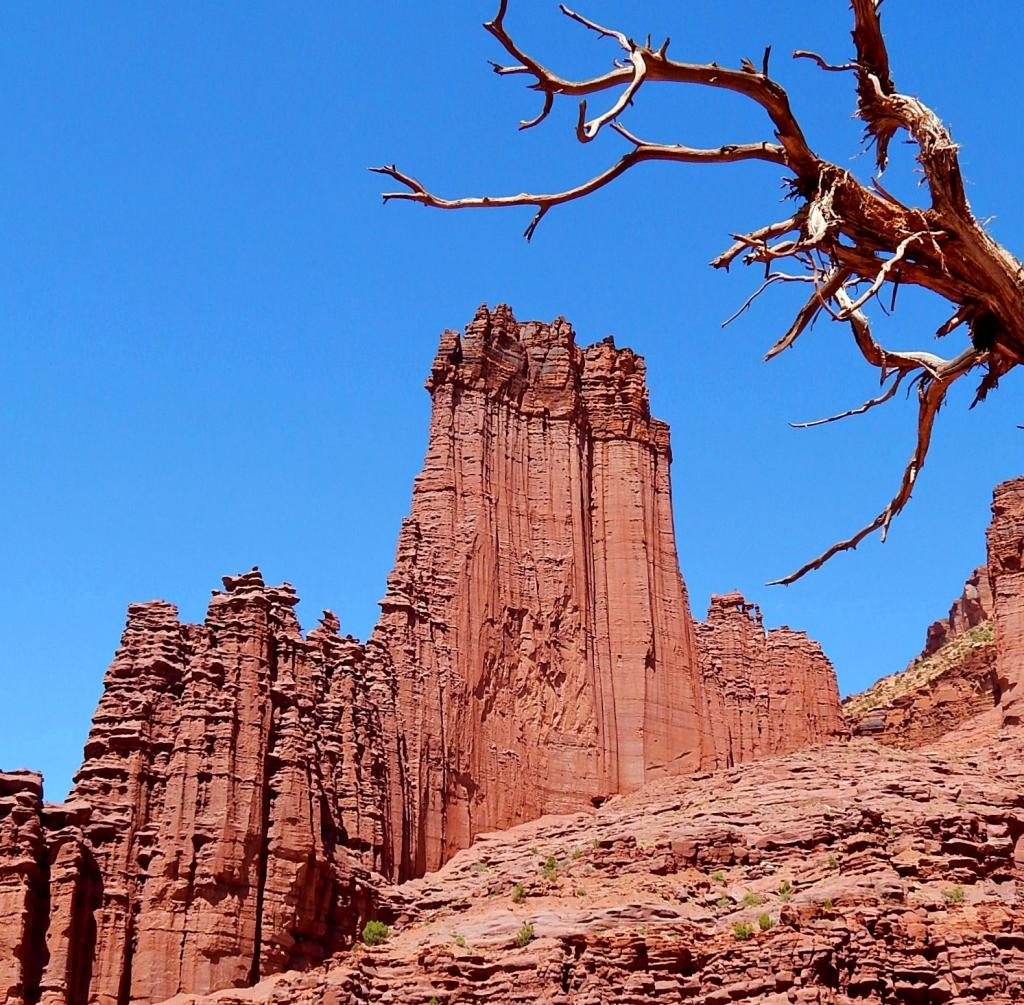

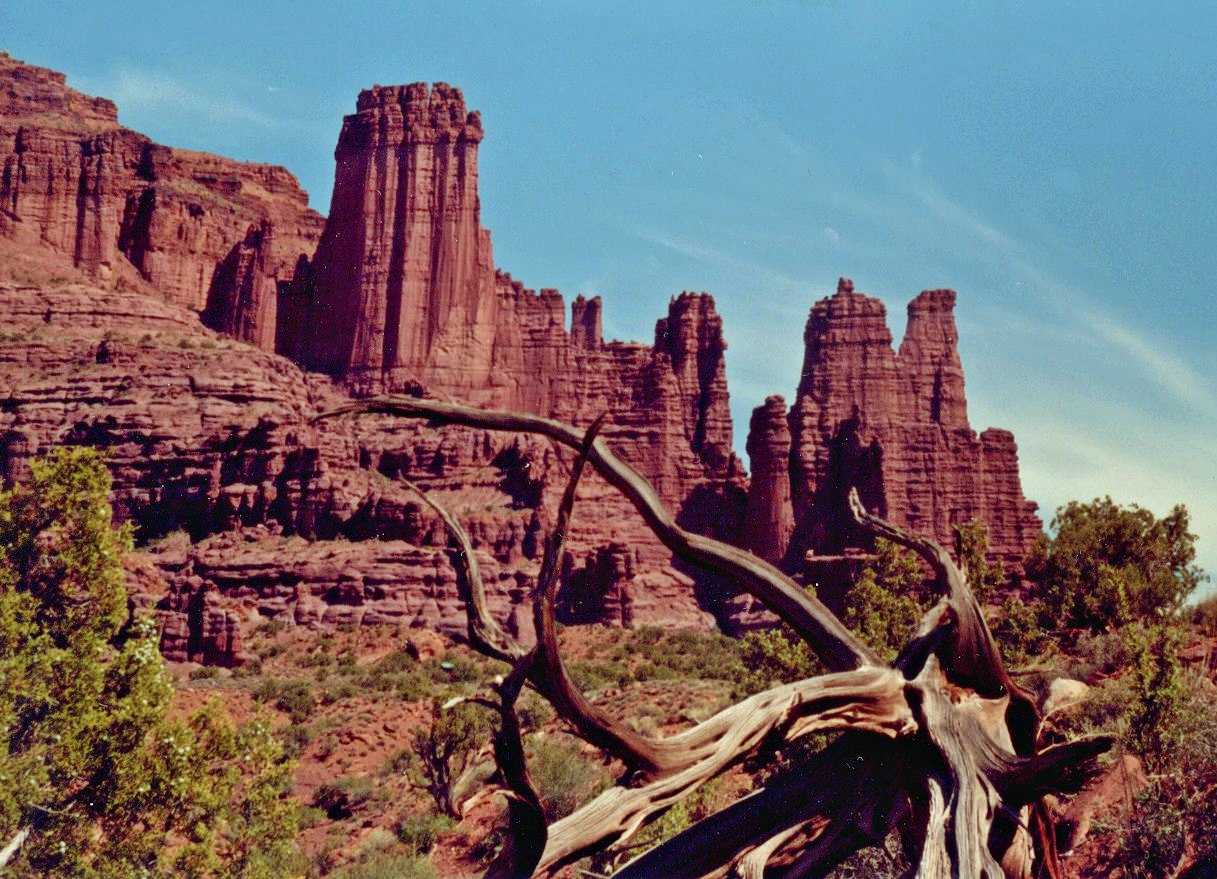

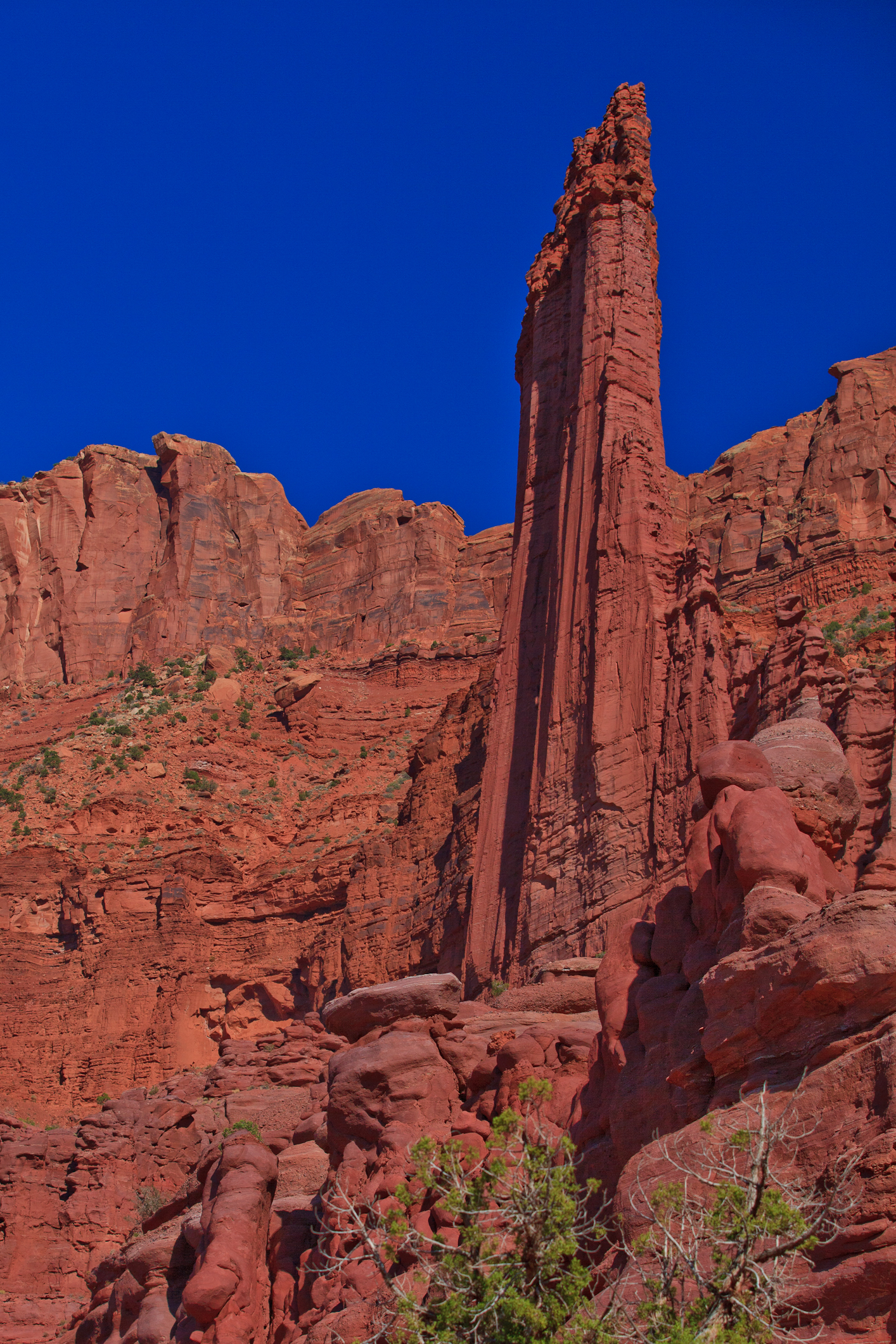

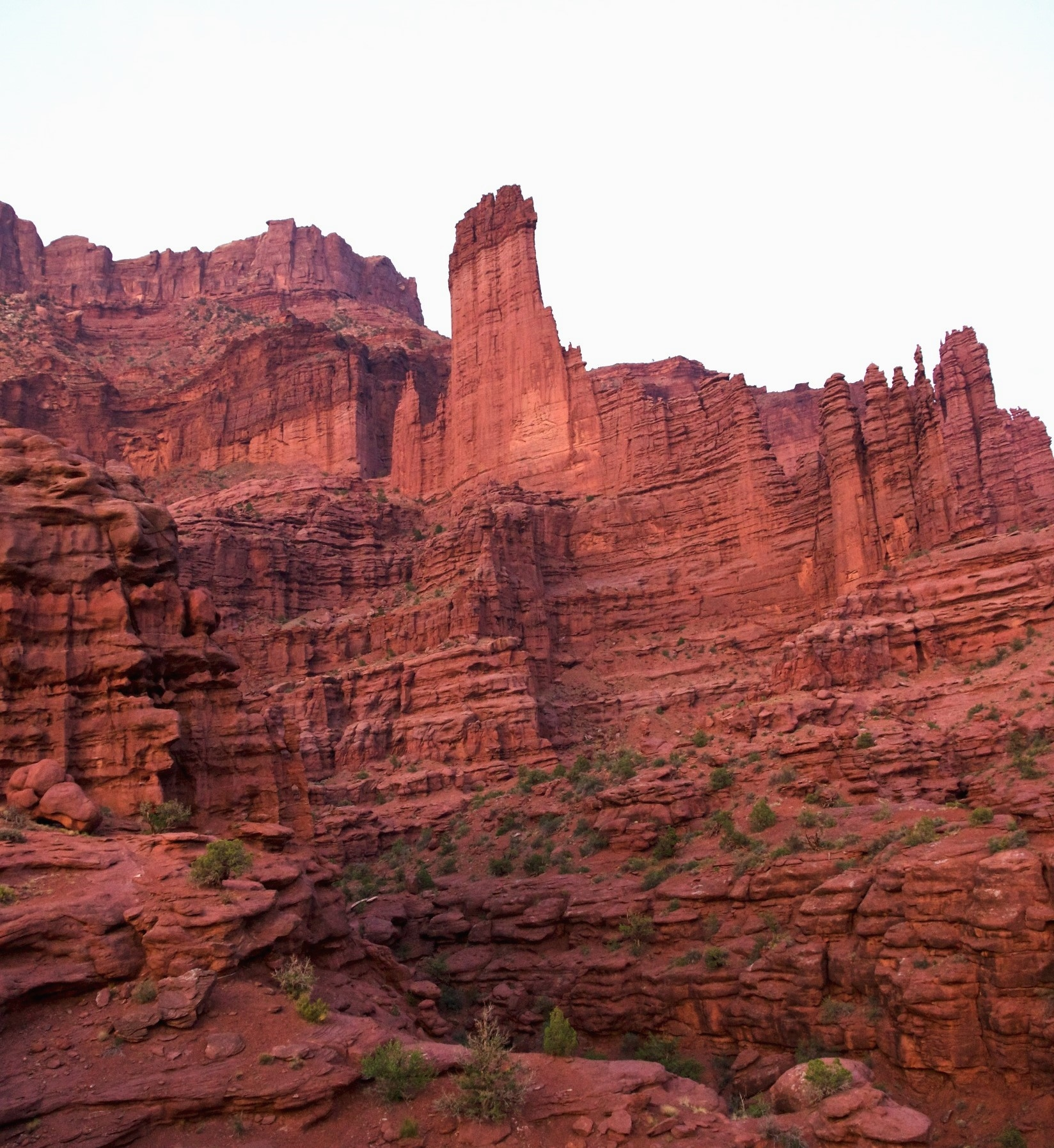
