= Harvey T. Carter =

American rock climber

Harvey T. Carter (September 30, 1930 – March 15, 2012) was an American rock climber noted for his hundreds of first ascents across Colorado and the Western United States. He founded Climbing magazine in 1970 from his basement with $900.

== First ascents ==
A partial list of some notable first ascents:

- 1960 – Kissing Couple
- 1960 – Sentinel Spire
- 1962 – Kingfisher Tower
- 1962 – The Rectory
- 1965 – Sister Superior
- 1965 – Convent
- 1966 – Echo Tower
- 1966 – Owl Rock
- 1967 – Cottontail Tower
- 1969 – "Flashflood", Haystack Mountain
- 1970 – The Oracle
- 1979 – Terra Tower
