= Monk Bailey =

American football player (1938–2013)

No. 20, 28, 45, 26
- Position: Defensive back

Personal information
- Born: April 22, 1938; Moab, Utah, U.S.
- Died: June 18, 2015 (aged 77); Queen Creek, Arizona, U.S.
- Listed height: 6 ft 2 in (1.88 m)
- Listed weight: 180 lb (82 kg)

Career information
- High school: Grand (Moab)
- College: Utah (1956–1959)
- NFL draft: 1960: undrafted

Career history
- Los Angeles Chargers (1960)*; Central Florida Broncos (1962); St. Louis Cardinals (1963–1965); Toronto Argonauts (1966); Bridgeport Jets (1968); Jersey Jays (1969); Long Island Bulls (1969–1970)
- * Offseason or practice squad member only

Awards and highlights
- First-team All-Skyline (1959)
- Stats at Pro Football Reference

Claron Everett "Monk" Bailey Jr. (April 22, 1938 – June 18, 2015) was an American professional football player who was a defensive back for two seasons with the St. Louis Cardinals of the National Football League (NFL). He played college football for the Utah Utes. He also played for the Toronto Argonauts of the Canadian Football League (CFL), the Bridgeport Jets and Long Island Bulls of the Atlantic Coast Football League (ACFL), and the Jersey Jays of the Continental Football League (COFL).

== Early life ==
Claron Everett Bailey Jr. was born on April 22, 1938, in Moab, Utah. He attended Grand County High School in Moab and lettered in four sports.

== College career ==
Bailey played college football for the Utah Utes of the University of Utah as a fullback. He was on the freshman team in 1956. He was promoted to the main roster in 1957 and was a two-year letterman from 1958 to 1959. Bailey earned honorable mention All-Skyline Conference honors in 1958 and first-team All-Skyline honors in 1959. He rushed 252 times for 1,204 yards and 11 touchdowns during his college career.

== Professional career ==
After going undrafted in 1960, Bailey signed with the Los Angeles Chargers of the American Football League in April 1960. He was released on July 12, 1960. In May 1961, it was reported that Bailey would be finishing his degree in recreation at the University of Utah and hoping to return to pro football.

On August 22, 1962, Bailey signed with the Central Florida Broncos as a defensive halfback. He played for the Broncos during the 1962 season.

Bailey signed with the St. Louis Cardinals on January 16, 1963. He was released on August 27, 1963, and then signed to the team's taxi squad, where he spent the entire 1963 season. He became a free agent after the season and re-signed with the Cardinals on March 23, 1964. Bailey played in 12 games for the Cardinals in 1964 as a defensive back. He appeared in 11 games, starting four, in 1965 as a safety. He was released on August 31, 1966.

Bailey played in two games for the Toronto Argonauts of the Canadian Football League in 1966 and was listed as a halfback. He rushed 15 times for 43 yards and caught one pass for 43 yards that year.

Bailey played for the Bridgeport Jets of the Atlantic Coast Football League (ACFL) in 1968 as a cornerback/safety. He then played for the Jersey Jays of the Continental Football League in 1969, and the Long Island Bulls of the ACFL from 1969 to 1970.

== Personal life ==
Bailey joined The Church of Jesus Christ of Latter-day Saints in 1966. He also spent time as a high school and college football assistant coach, including stints at Weber State, Dixie State and Southern Virginia.

Bailey was diagnosed with pancreatic cancer in March 2015. He died at his home in Queen Creek, Arizona on June 18, 2015.
