= Porcupine Rim Trail =

Popular mountain biking trail in Utah

The Porcupine Rim Trail, located near Moab, Utah, is a popular mountain biking trail almost as famous as the Slickrock Trail. This 14.4-mile (23.2 km) trail is ridden one way with shuttle service or as a 30.8-mile (49.6 km) loop. The trailhead is located in the Sand Flats Recreation Area about 8 miles (12.9 km) past the Slickrock trailhead. The trail begins with a double-track climb gaining 900 feet (274.3 m) in 4 miles (6.4 km) with partially shaded rocky, dirt/sand and slickrock terrain which is rideable in its entirety except for a few small sections. There is a scenic outlook at the top of the climb which is a common rest stop.

The 11-mile (17.7 km) descent to the Colorado River loses 2,800 feet (853.4 m) of elevation and consists of single and double-track rock, slickrock and a few short loose sandy sections. It has many technical sections with drops ranging from a few inches to under 2 feet. Other drops, wall rides, and freeride elements are scattered throughout on the sides of the trail. The last mile is very technical, exposed and parallels the Colorado River. The trail ends at Highway 128 very near Grandstaff Canyon (formerly Negro Bill Canyon). (38°36′52″N 109°31′45″W)The Porcupine Rim Trail is closed to motorized use 8.6 miles from the Sand Flats Road trailhead at its intersection with a primitive route leading north to Mat Martin Point (http://sandflats.org/652/Porcupine-Rim-Bike-Trail)
