= Kokopelli's Trail =

Multi-use trail in Utah and Colorado, U.S.

Coordinates: 39.177737°N 108.827444°W

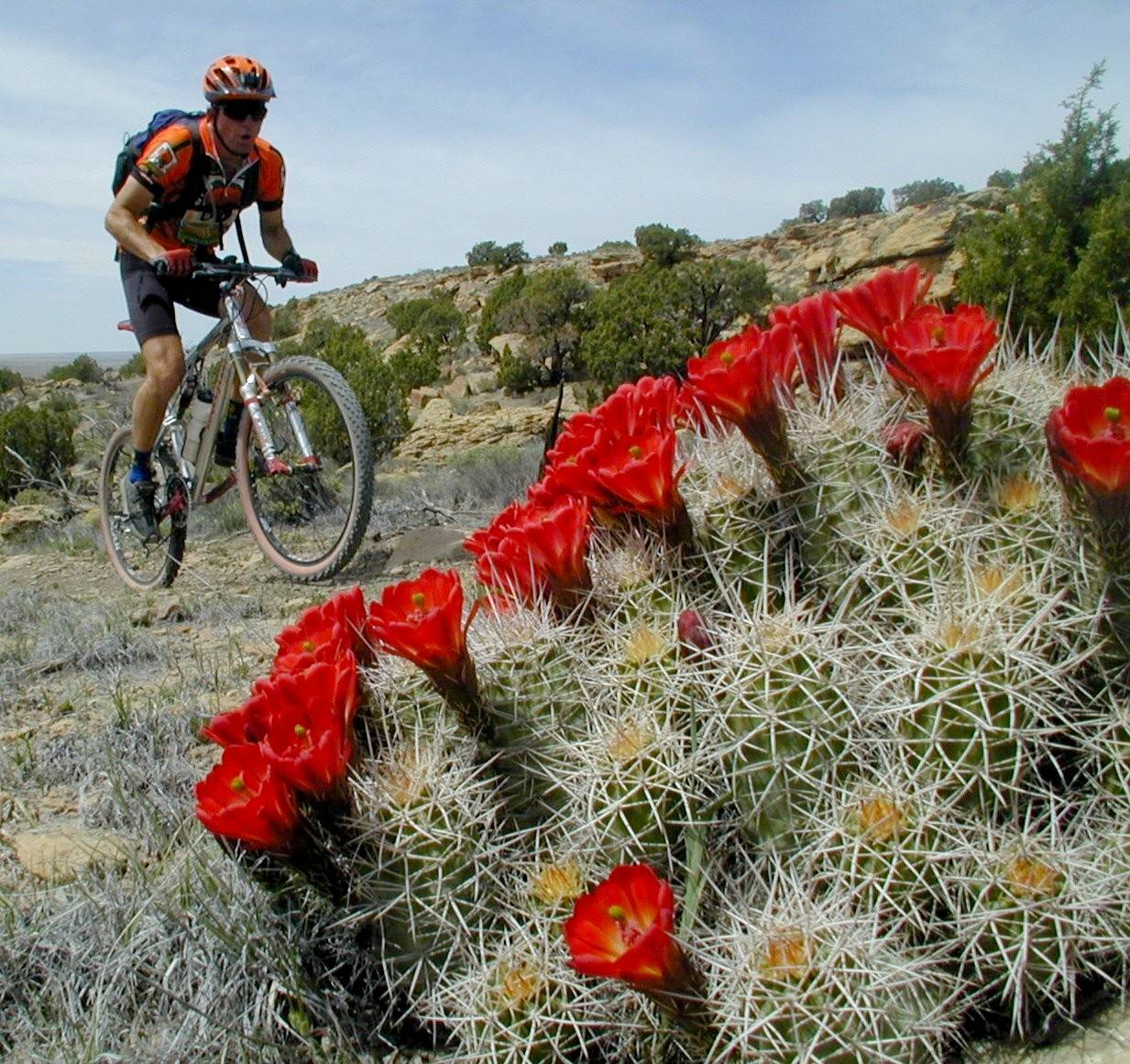
- Cyclist in the McInnis Canyons National Conservation Area along the Kokopelli's Trail in Colorado, July 2013
- Length: 142 miles (229 km)
- Location: Grand County, Utah and Mesa County, Colorado in the United States
- Established: 1989
- Use: Mountain bikng, hiking
- Highest point: 8,400 feet (2,600 m)
- Lowest point: 4,000 feet (1,200 m)
- Season: mid-June–September (for higher elevations)
- Surface: Varied

Kokopelli's Trail (also known as the Kokopelli Trail) is a 142-mile (229 km) multi-use trail (but primarily used by mountain bikes) in Grand County, Utah, and Mesa County, Colorado, in the western United States. The trail was named in honor of its mythic muse, Kokopelli. The trail was created by the Colorado Plateau Mountain Bike Trail Association (COPMOBA) in cooperation with the Bureau of Land Management (BLM) and the United States Forest Service (USFS) in 1989.

== Description ==
Stylized Kokopelli, a Native American deity

The Kokopelli's Trail begins near Loma, Colorado in the McInnis Canyons National Conservation Area. The trail follows Mary's Loop through the Mack Ridge mountain biking area before crossing Salt Creek and entering Rabbit Valley. From Rabbit Valley, the trail winds south roughly following the Colorado River until it crosses Utah State Route 128 and the river in Dewey, Utah, where it begins the uphill section, eventually looping around the La Sal Mountains, then descending into Moab, Utah, via the Porcupine Rim Trail.

The trail is widely varied in difficulty, terrain, and elevation. It has intense downhill sections and steep climbs, but several gently sloping road sections help to balance the trail and make it accessible to advanced and beginning mountain bikers alike. The terrain mostly consists of either single track, 4x4 roads, or country roads. The elevation changes can be daunting, with the lowest point near 4,000 feet (1,200 m) and two massive climbs reaching elevations of 8,400 feet (2,600 m). The lush Colorado River valley is seen several times from high cliffs and the beautiful La Sal Mountains grow in size as riders continue on the trail.

There are eight small campsites along the trail, some of which require a fee. While each campsite has toilets, none have drinking water available and most do not provide shade. Because of a lack of drinking water on the trail, support vehicles must be used to meet riders at certain camping spots in order to replenish their water supply. The trail normally takes about 5 to 6 days to finish, but more advanced riders can do it in much less time. Riding season in the higher elevation (La Sal Mountains) is limited to mid-June through September, depending on the snowpack.

The trail descends into Moab, Utah, via Sand Flats Road, passing the Slickrock Trail. Riders may elect to finish via Porcupine Rim—and many do—although this is not the official end to the trail as mentioned in the above description.

On May 30, 2020, Australian biker, Lachlan Morton, set a new record for completing the trail. His time of 11 hour 14 minutes beat the previous record holder's (Kurt Refsnider) time of 11 hours 52 minutes. Following his ride Morton stated that he did not begin the ride planning on setting a new record on his trip from Moab to Loma, but after the ride went so well on the first section, he decided to push himself to toward the end.

== See also ==
- American Discovery Trail
- Paradox Trail
- Colorado Plateau
