= Zane Taylor =

Zane Taylor may refer to:

- Zane Taylor (footballer) (born 1957), Australian rules footballer for Geelong and Southport
- Zane Taylor (American football) (born 1988), American football center
- Zane Taylor, a fictional character from the television series "Heroes"
