= Morning Glory Natural Bridge =

Natural rock arch in Moab, Utah, US

- Rock arch
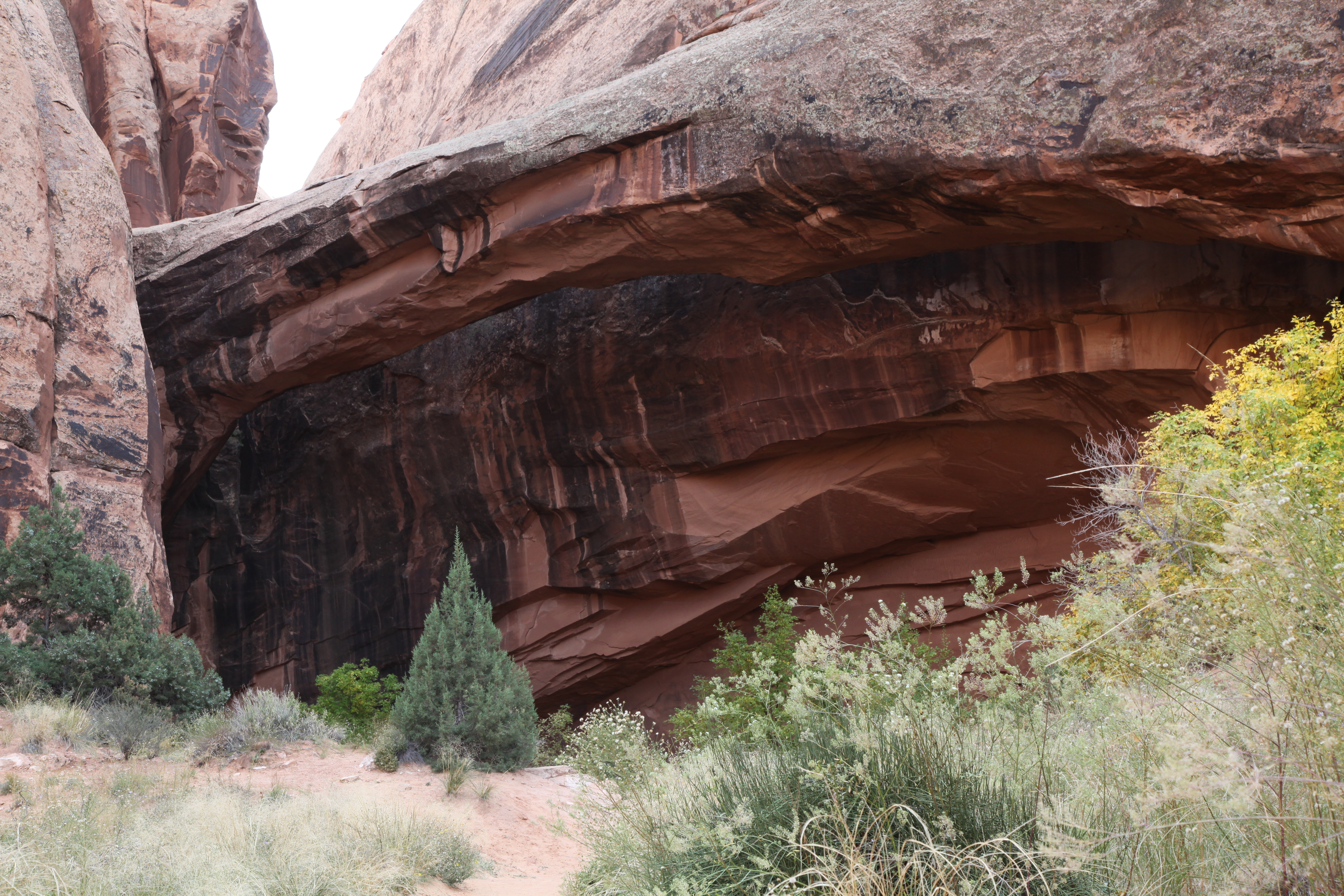
- View of the arch

- Location in Utah Location in Utah
- Coordinates: 38°35′37″N 109°30′31″W
- Location: Moab, Utah, United States

Dimensions
  - Length: 243 ft (74 m)
  - Width: 18 ft (5.5 m)
  - Height: 77.5 ft (23.6 m)
- Elevation: 4,315 ft (1,315 m)

Morning Glory Natural Bridge is a large alcove arch located in Grandstaff Canyon near Moab, Utah.

== Background ==
The bridge has a span of 243 feet, making it the sixth longest natural arch span in the United States. It can be reached via a 4-mile round trip hike on the Grandstaff Trail from Utah State Route 128. Grandstaff Canyon is protected by the Bureau of Land Management, and no fees are required to hike to Morning Glory Bridge.
