= Shockwave (TV series) =

- A screenshot of the title in the introduction of Shockwave.
- Genre: Documentary
- Created by: Cheri Sundae Productions
- Narrated by: Jim Forbes
- Country of origin: United States
- Original language: English
- No. of seasons: 2
- No. of episodes: 33

Production
- Executive producers: Cheri Brownlee; Steve Ligerman; Richard Wortman
- Producer: Chris Lehman
- Editors: David Milhous; Todd Felker
- Running time: 44 minutes (without commercials)

Original release
- Network: History Channel
- Release: November 30, 2007 – October 3, 2008

Shockwave is an American documentary television series that premiered on November 30, 2007, on the History Channel. The program compiles video footage and eyewitness accounts to the headline making events and attempts to educate the viewer as to what really happened in a particular event.

The show depicts the United Airlines Flight 232 crash, USS Forrestal fire, the Killdozer, the Mount Hood hiking incident, the deadly Ramstein airshow disaster, and the PEPCON disaster.

The toolbox of resources which the show employs to perform this task include the following items:

- Video footage
- Photographs
- 3-D renderings (computer-generated imagery) of the event
- Eyewitness accounts (testimony/interviews)
- Participant accounts (interviews)

Each episode has typically four, five or six stories (or events). For each, people who witnessed the event or who were involved in the event are interviewed, video footage and photos of the event are shown, and 3-D renderings of the event are shown.

== Episodes ==
=== Season 1 (2007–2008) ===
Episode	Broadcast date	Description
1	November 30, 2007	1. Amsterdam, New York (April 27, 2002) – a house explodes during a firefighting exercise 2. Okinawa, Japan (August 20, 2007) – the explosion of China Airlines Flight 120 at Naha Airport; 3. Attica, Kansas (May 12, 2004) – a tornado rips through town, destroying a house 4. Gulf of Tonkin, Vietnam (July 29, 1967) – the USS Forrestal Fire; 5. Jefferson, Georgia (March 26, 2000) – a driver's son runs out on the track to check on him and is hit by an out of control car 6. Mount Hood, Oregon (May 30, 2002) – a helicopter crashes while trying to rescue injured mountain climbers
2	December 7, 2007	1. El Toro Air Base, California (April 24, 1988) – an F/A-18 Hornet crashes while performing at an air show 2. Honolulu, Hawaii (August 15, 1980) – a firefighter is engulfed in flames while battling a fire at an oil storage facility 3. St George, Utah (January 11, 2005) – flooding of the Santa Clara river destroys residential homes 4. New Providence, Iowa (July 20, 2000) – a water tower collapses, taking construction workers down with it 5. Butte, Montana (December 20, 1989) – the Terry Rossland case 6. Henderson, Nevada (May 4, 1988) – the PEPCON disaster
3	December 14, 2007	1. Brooklyn, New York (May 4, 2004) – a helicopter crashes onto a roof while covering the aftermath of a shooting 2. Chesapeake Bay (September 30, 1981) – testing of a snake eye bomb accidentally blows a chase plane out of the sky 3. Ursa, Illinois (December 8, 1989) – an old silo crashes onto a bulldozer as a farmer tries to take it down 4. Memphis, Tennessee (May 13, 1994) – funny car driver Jerry Caminito crashes into the guardrail at 280 mph and flips 5. Uffculme, England (November 17, 1998) – a spark at a fireworks factory leads to a massive series of explosions 6. Atlanta, Georgia (April 12, 1999) – a man is trapped on a crane over a structural fire
4	December 21, 2007	1. USS Theodore Roosevelt, Persian Gulf (February 20, 1991) – Petty Officer JD Bridges is sucked into the engine of a jet 2. Off the coast of South Africa (August 4, 1991) – the sinking of the MTS Oceanos; 3. Muroc Dry Lake, California (June 28, 1998) & El Mirage Dry Lake, California (July 12, 1998) – Ron Cook crashes multiple times as he attempts to break the land speed record 4. Comoros Islands (November 23, 1996) – the crash landing of Ethiopian Airlines Flight 961; 5. Three Rivers, Texas (August 25, 1990) – firefighters run after an oil tank fire explodes
5	December 28, 2007	1. Milwaukee, Wisconsin (April 11, 1989) – Pilot Ben Moore crashes as he attempts to lift an air conditioning unit off of a building 2. Ennis, Texas (October 7, 2005) – the pro stock racing accident between Bruce Allen and Kenny Koretsky; 3. Tucson, Arizona (December 27, 1984) – rescuers try to save three men whose truck got submerged in a river during a flood 4. USS Kitty Hawk, off the Coast of Japan (July 11, 1994) – a fighter jet crashes and explodes while landing 5. Poipu, Hawaii (September 11, 1992) – Hurricane Iniki makes landfall in Hawaii
6	January 4, 2008	1. Niagara Falls, New York (March 20, 2003) – rescue of a man on the edge of Niagara Falls; 2. Firebird Raceway, Phoenix, Arizona (October 21, 2003) – Scotty Lumbert crashes while drag boat racing and his escape capsule crashes onto dry land 3. Montserrat, Lesser Antilles (July 18, 1995) – eruption of the Soufrière Hills volcano 4. Kingfisher, Oklahoma (August 19, 2007) – firefighters try to rescue a couple trapped in the middle of a flood 5. Naval Air Engineering Station, Lakehurst, New Jersey (July 1, 1986) – the crash of the Piasecki PA-97 Heli-stat; 6. Mokulēia State Beach, Hawaii (May 31, 2001) – kitesurfer Erik Eck is dragged into the sky by a wind gust before crashing
7	January 25, 2008	1. Clinton Township, Michigan (August 28, 1998) – Escape Artist Jasen Magic is engulfed in flames when his trick backfires 2. Sioux City, Iowa (July 19, 1989) – the crash of United Airlines Flight 232; 3. Rantoul, Illinois (August 7, 2004) – a skydiver's parachute opens too soon and he gets caught on the back of the plane's wing 4. Bowling Green, Kentucky (September 29, 2004) – Russell Sublett's 4 day siege inside a mansion 5. Portland, Oregon (February 1, 1996) – A father and son check out a house they were renovating have to outrun a mudslide
8	February 1, 2008	1. Bering Sea, Alaska (March 15, 1990) – rescuers try to save the crew of the Alaskan Monarch after it becomes trapped in ice 2. Corpus Christi, Texas (April 15, 1995) – a jet ski racer is torpedoed by a competitor 3. USS Abraham Lincoln, Indian Ocean (July 9, 1991) – a Navy crewman is only partially ejected out of his jet when his ejection system fails 4. Grandby, Colorado (June 4, 2004) – the Killdozer incident 5. Lakeside, California (October 25, 2003) – residents are forced to drive through the Cedar Fire to survive
9	February 8, 2008	1. Murdock, Illinois (September 2, 1983) – a train derails and explodes 2. Daytona International Speedway, Florida (February 11, 1990) – Paramedic Mike Staley is hit by a racecar while treating another driver 3. Cook Inlet, Alaska (July 7, 1999) – a fishing boat sinks and the captain goes down with the ship 4. Cornwall, England (November 13, 1991 & August 13, 1992) – Matt Coulter's attempts to jump an ATV over a steam boat 5. Cape Canaveral Air Station, Florida (January 17, 1997) – explosion of the Delta II Rocket
10	February 15, 2008	1. Englishtown, New Jersey (July 8, 1990) – NRHA driver Johnny West is knocked out cold when his funny car slams against a guardrail and crashes at the end of the track 2. Cerro Negro, Nicaragua (May 12, 2002) – Éric Barone crashes as he attempts to ride his bike down the side of the Cerro Negro volcano 3. Allanburg, Canada (August 11, 2001) – the MS Windoc crashes into a lowered drawbridge 4. USS America, Mediterranean Sea (December 28, 1982) – a fighter jet malfunctions while landing and goes over the side of the carrier 5. Oahu, Hawaii (January 25, 1993) – tourist Hugh Alexander is sucked into the Moi Hole and struggles to get out
11	February 22, 2008	1. Ramstein Air Force Base, Germany (August 28, 1988) – the Ramstein air show disaster 2. Perth, Australia (March 4 & 26, 1997) – stunt driver Ray Baumann's multiple attempts to beat the world's longest car jump 3. Indian Ocean (July 21, 1991) – the sinking of the Greek Tanker Kirki; 4. Rantoul, Illinois (August 4, 2003) – Skydiver Tim Bernard crashes when he tries to swoop in and out of a plane hangar 5. Denver, Colorado (November 30, 2005) – two window washers are trapped on their scaffold when the support cables fail 6. Oklahoma City, Oklahoma (March 21, 2002) – firefighters try to put out a motel fire when the roof caves in on them
12	February 29, 2008	1. King's Speedway, Hanford, California (October 4, 1997) – Midget Racecar Driver Donny Oliver crashes and is engulfed in flames 2. San Francisco, California (December 11, 1995) – a sinkhole swallows a mansion 3. Edwards Air Force Base, Rosamand, California (August 25, 1976) – a pilot struggles to pull his Lockhead T33 out of a death spiral 4. Red Bluff, California (May 26, 2002) – Mark Atkinson's drag boat crashes and he opens the safety capsule too soon 5. Siloam Springs, Arkansas (October 9, 2005) – the skydiving accident of Shayna Richardson; 6. Hell's Hole, Arizona (June 26, 1994) – a Pavehawk crashes while trying to rescue hikers, and a man's leg is pinned by the wreckage
13	March 14, 2008	1. Boston, Massachusetts (August 16, 1985) – a pipe bomb defusal goes bad, catching bomb technician Randy Lamatina in the blast 2. Dunbar, Pennsylvania (September 2, 2000) – a skydiver is stuck upside down on a plane and there's no way to free him 3. Del Mar, California (July 4, 2001) – Daredevil Bubba Blackwell crashes while trying to jump his Harley over a row of parked cars 4. Valdez, Alaska (April 7, 1997) – an extreme skier tumbles down the mountain 5. Anne Arundel, Maryland (August 12, 2005) – a motorcycle stunt goes bad when rider Ben Smolen misses the foam pit and faceplants onto a bulldozer 6. Brisbane, Australia (October 4, 1999) – a utility worker gets sucked into a storm drain while clearing away debris

=== Season 2 (2008) ===
Episode	Broadcast Date	Description
14	May 2, 2008	1. Salinas, California (October 3, 1999) – pilot Wayne Handley crashes while showing off his Oracle Turbo Raven; 2. Crested Butte, Colorado (February 18, 1998) – a snowmobile lands on top of another rider during the Winter X Games; 3. Hagerstown Speedway, Maryland (October 13, 1996) – racer Jack Bland's crash into the guardrail at Hagerstown; 4. Mexico City, Mexico (July 12, 2000) – soap opera star Anadela's magic trick backfires, catching her in the explosion 5. Fort Lauderdale, Florida (April 6, 1997) – the Coast Guard has to act fast when a sight-seeing boat is dragged underneath a barge
15	May 9, 2008	1. Firebird Lake, Arizona (February 24, 1985) – a drag boat crashes into powerlines 2. Valdez, Alaska (April 2, 1992) – extreme skier Garrett Bartelt's tumble down the mountains 3. Mangalore, Australia (April 12, 1998) – an ultralight plane flies out of control and into a spectator 4. Tampa, Florida (March 11, 2001) – a skateboarder is knocked out cold as he attempts to skate a 360 loop 5. Big Island, Hawaii (April 21, 1990) – the eruption of Mount Kīlauea destroys homes in the town of Kalapana; 6. Adelaide Hills, Australia (April 19, 1992) – a jockey is dragged by his horse when he falls off it
16	May 16, 2008	1. Valle De Bravo, Mexico (January 18, 2005) – Para-glider Joe Parr falls into some trees and then to the ground 2. Firebird Lake, Arizona (September 13, 1983) – Daredevil Spanky Spangler's attempt at a world record jump leaves him stuck upside down in his car and without oxygen 3. Monterey Bay, California (March 12, 1999) – a CH-46 Seaknight catches fire shortly after takeoff, trapping reports on the burning craft 4. Chiefland, Florida (March 4, 2004) – a boater is launched out of his vehicle when it flips and skips across the water 5. Norfolk, Virginia (September 3, 1984) – a firefighter plunges into a pool of burning gasoline while fighting a tanker fire
17	May 23, 2008	1. Middle River, Maryland (September 14, 1997) – an F-117 Nighthawk crashes onto a family's house 2. Albuquerque, New Mexico (October 10, 2004) – a hot air balloon with two kids on it crashes into a radio tower 3. Twin Falls, Idaho (June 4, 1999) – "Flying Mike" Brown crashes underneath a ramp while performing a stunt 4. Stateline, Nevada (August 27, 1980) – the bombing at Harvey's casino 5. Chad's Gap, Utah – (March 6, 2005) – freestyle skier Tanner Hall comes up short in a backwards facing jump and breaks both of his ankles 6. Moab, Utah (April 1, 1991) – a newlywed couple crash while traversing the Lion's Back
18	May 30, 2008	1. Cottonwood, Arizona (November 19, 2004) – a routine training exercise leaves several firefighters caught in a flashover 2. Queensland, Australia (September 17, 2007) – Phil Lamattina's top fuel dragster breaks apart and explodes against the guardrails 3. Jalalabad, Afghanistan (April 5, 2007) – a suicide bomber in a van targets marines in a Humvee; 4. Mohawk River, New York (May 6, 2000) – five boaters are trapped against a dam 5. Los Angeles, California (August 2, 2007) – skater Jake Brown does a 720 degree spin and then falls several feet onto his back 6. Hakkari, Turkey (November 12, 2006) – pop star Aydan Aydan and his crew get trapped in an avalanche while making a music video
19	June 6, 2008	1. Mountain Home Air Force Base, Idaho (September 14, 2003) – an F16 crashes during an airshow 2. Peterborough, England (May 2, 1991) – a skydiving instructor is choked by his parachute chord, forcing a cameraman to make a daring rescue 3. Union, Missouri (October 26, 1996) – Texas Jack Hondo accidentally blows himself up 4. Berthoud Pass, Colorado (February 15, 1987) – a rogue avalanche takes aim at a camera crew 5. Lake Havasu, Arizona (October 17, 1999) – a jet ski racer crashes on another racer 6. Spanaway, Washington (August 12, 2000) – a multicar crash at the racetrack leaves one racer burning alive
20	June 13, 2008	1. Oceanside, California (December 9, 1999) – a marine training exercise turns deadly when the Seaknight they're on crashes into the water 2. Oklahoma City, Oklahoma (August 17, 2003) – a college student is lost in a cloud of smoke when she crashes into an oil tank fire 3. Lake Austin, Texas (March 7, 2005) – two boaters are caught against the wall of a dam, and their boat is slowly being crushed 4. St Lawrence River, Canada (October 5, 1979) – stuntman Kenny Powers tries to jump a rocket powered car across the Canadian-US border, but comes up very short 5. New York City, New York (August 23, 2001) – a French parasailist gets caught on the torch of the Statue of Liberty
21	June 20, 2008	1. Moreton Bay, Australia (November 8, 1997) – a demolition crew looking to make a new coral reef gets caught in the explosion 2. Dayton, Ohio (August 20, 2000) – a man and his grandson crash land their plane on a tarmac and the vehicle explodes 3. Sandy Springs, Georgia (January 16, 1997) – one of Eric Rudolph's infamous bombings caught on tape 4. Waialua, Hawaii (May 13, 1988) – a helicopter crashes while assisting a utility crew, and it's up to a man named Tiny to help free the pilot 5. Corsica, France (April 8, 2004) – a kayaker is caught in a whirlpool
22	June 27, 2008	1. Aurora, Ohio (August 17, 1996) – a motorboat crashes into the crowd during a water ski show at Sea World; 2. Chilecito, Argentina (July 24, 1994) – a father and daughter are trapped over a gorge when their cable car comes off the tracks 3. Isle of Man (May 31, 2003) – motorcycle racer "Richard Quayle" crashes into a wall at 190 mph 4. London, England (May 5, 1980) – an SAS officer gets caught in their own blast during the Iranian Embassy siege 5. Banzai Pipeline, Hawaii (December 31, 2002) – an underwater photographer is slammed to the ocean floor by a wave
23	July 11, 2008	1. Mount Pobeda, Kyrgyzstan (August 6, 2005) – an overloaded helicopter full of mountain climbers crashes in the snow during an operation in a mountainous area 2. Brentwood, Tennessee (May 5, 2002) – a bank robber opens fire on a female officer 3. Gull Lake, Minnesota (July 5, 1991) – a tornado that struck a lake sets it's sights on vacationers hiding in the house 4. Bristol, Virginia (April 15, 2008) – a tanker truck explodes, blowing officers and firefighters away 5. Tampa, Florida (February 10, 2002) – a human cannonball named "Ermes Zamperla" overshoots the safety net, and crash lands onto the ground
24	July 18, 2008	1. St Augustine, Florida (September 14, 2003) – firefighters putting out a jet dryer fire are caught in an explosion 2. Minneapolis, Minnesota (May 11, 1991) – a boat is crushed when it goes over a waterfall, and rescuers race to pull them all out of the river 3. Oxnard, California (February 14, 2005) – a truck is obliterated by an Amtrak train 4. Gold Coast, Australia (March 5, 2004) – two people are trapped in a raging river after trying to drive their jeep through flood waters 5. Fenton, Missouri (August 10, 1991) – a tunnel boat launches off of one boat and onto an island, almost hitting a cameraman 6. Jerome, Idaho (November 30, 1991) – a jockey is launched into the sky during a chariot race
25	July 25, 2008	1. San Diego, California (January 16, 1998) – a lifeguard is caught in an explosion while lighting a boat on fire 2. Andover, Kansas (April 26, 1991) – Reporter Gregg Jarrett and several bystanders are caught underneath a bridge during a massive tornado outbreak 3. Baghdad, Iraq (June 2, 2005) – a US soldier is hit in the chest by an Iraqi sniper 4. Jacksonville, Florida (December 19, 2007) – the T2 laboratories explosion 5. Kent, England (July 26, 1984) – a skydiver is caught upside-down in two ripped parachutes
26	August 8, 2008	1. Hennessey, Oklahoma (May 24, 2008) – a pig farm is ripped to shreds by a tornado 2. San Francisco, California (October 14, 2002) – Deaf motorcycle rider Paul Macdonald performing a stunt on an abandoned highway slams into a parked car 3. Lake Pontiac, Michigan (July 29, 1994) – two guys taping a fishing show catch a plane crashing into the water 4. Park City, Utah (December 10, 2004) – a skier is stuck on a ski lift, being choked by his helmet and backpack 5. San Francisco, California (September 8, 1984) – two base jumpers slam into the Golden Gate Bridge; 6. Mexico City, Mexico (June 30, 1997) – an oil tanker is hit by a train and explodes
27	August 15, 2008	1. St Augustine, Florida (March 26, 1985) – a pilot's wheel is stuck, forcing a mechanic to make a daring rescue 2. Honolulu, Hawaii (August 20, 1994) – the tragedy of Tyke the Elephant; 3. Cedar Valley, Utah (June 13, 2008) – Pilot Dennis Kenyon crashes his helicopter while doing a loop 4. Santa Fe, Argentina (January 17, 1999) – after a bus plunges into the Colastiné River, a crane sent to help remove the bus also falls in 5. Plymouth, England (August 6, 2005) – the powerboat crash of James Sheppard and Chris Parsonage
28	August 22, 2008	1. Fullerton, California (September 25, 2004) – a replica Ford Trimotor crashes into an occupied car as it attempts to take off 2. Salt Lake City, Utah (December 13, 2003) – a rock band's van slams into an accident site 3. USS Enterprise, Atlantic Ocean (November 8, 1998) – an EA-6B Prowler crashes into an S3 Viking on deck, putting 6 lives in instant peril 4. Assisi, Italy (September 26, 1997) – an aftershock causes the Basilica of Saint Francis to collapse, trapping architects and clergy members inside 5. Sydney, Australia (November 4, 2006) – two surf boats collide during a race
29	September 5, 2008	1. Fort Campbell, Kentucky (June 18, 1996) – two helicopters on a training exercise collide 2. North Hollywood, California (February 28, 1997) – police officers battle two heavily armed bank robbers in a 44-minute gun battle 3. Stockton, California (June 24, 1999) – a canopy being constructed for an outdoor concert collapses during a strong wind gust 4. City of White Rock, Canada (July 28, 2001) – a motorized para-glider crashes into power lines
30	September 12, 2008	1. Paris, Texas (June 29, 2008) – a centuries-old furniture building explodes and collapses 2. Manning, South Carolina (November 19, 1996) – a police chase ends when the suspect's vehicle is slammed against into a set of gas pumps 3. Eglin Air Force Base, Florida (October 29, 1980) – a C-130 Transport plane crashes during landing 4. Newton, Iowa (January 6, 2006) – construction workers are trapped under a wall when it collapses 5. British Columbia, Canada (March 7, 2004) – skier Will Burks is caught in an avalanche at Mica Creek; 6. Las Vegas, Nevada (June 20, 1999) – motorcycle rider Seth Enslow crashes when his bike breaks in two during a jump
31	September 19, 2008	1. Tacoma, Washington (October 6, 2007) – the Atlas foundry explosion 2. Manchester, South Dakota (June 24, 2003) – a town is wiped off the map by a tornado 3. New York City, New York (May 14, 1991) – the NYFD has to rappel down the side of a building to rescue a man caught in a fire 4. Simferopol, Ukraine (July 10, 2006) – a passenger plane crashes at the end of a runway 5. Lexington, Ohio (June 25, 2006) – racer Joey Hand's BMW is nudged and flips end over end 6. Dallas, Texas (July 4, 1988) – stuntman Jimmy Lynn Davis is slammed to the ground when his motorcycle hang glider is caught by an updraft
32	September 26, 2008	1. Houston, Texas (February 11, 2007) – Good Samaritans race to free 3 people involved in a brutal highway accident 2. USS Enterprise, Pacific Ocean (January 14, 1969) – the USS Enterprise fire and explosion 3. San Antonio, Texas (February 19, 2004) – a helicopter assisting in a police pursuit crashes 4. Boscastle, England (August 16, 2004) – the 2004 Boscastle floods 5. Bonneville Salt Flats, Utah (August 20, 1992) – driver Jim Mederer flips his car while attempting to set a land speed record 6. Lebanon, New York (June 24, 2003) – "Wild Man" Al Sleep's dump truck crashes and flips on its roof during a stunt
33*	October 3, 2008	1. Rochester, New Hampshire (January 11, 2000) – Firefighters race to rescue a family from a house fire 2. Punta Gorda, Florida (June 29, 2002) – two men are stuck on a dam after falling while trying to clean it 3. Lunenburg, Canada (July 31, 1980) – the sinking of the FV Margaret Jane; 4. Eugene, Oregon (July 12, 1990) – a cameraman races to rescue a skydiver after a skydiving bungee-jumping accident 5. Sonoma, California (July 24, 1998) – the drag race accident of Shelley Anderson; 6. Valle de Bravo, Mexico – a helicopter falls into the water while shooting a soap opera, trapping actor Andres Garcia inside

*denotes lack of info for show due to unavailability of episode

== Reception ==
Common Sense Media rated the show 3 out of 5 stars.

== See also ==
- World's Most Amazing Videos
- Seconds from Disaster
- Critical Situation
- Destroyed in Seconds
- Most Daring
