= Moab Jeep Safari =

Annual off-road vehicle event during Easter Weekend hosted in Moab, Utah

A non-Easter Jeep Safari in Moab

The Jeep Safari is an annual event hosted by the Red Rock 4-Wheelers off-road club, where 4-wheelers come to challenge the rough terrain of the backcountry in the Moab, Utah area. Although its title does say it is a festival of Jeeps, a few take on the trails in 4x4 trucks. The Easter Weekend safari lasts for nine days, going through Easter Sunday.

== Expeditions ==
When going 4-wheeling, people can either go alone, or join up in a group. Groups usually meet up early in the day, at a certain location in the city. First waivers are signed and collected, then the drivers are given instruction and told to comply with any and all Bureau of Land Management regulations (i.e. stay on the trail, avoid walking on protected soil, etc.). Groups will then head out to the trails for the day. Once a group arrives at a trail, they will partially deflate ("air down") their tires to get better traction on sand or slick rock. Once the air down is completed they will begin the trail and depending on the trail and the number of stops, it can take anywhere from a few hours to all day.

Many groups do radio introductions, over the CB radio, where a person (often the driver) will introduce his/her self and any passengers in the car. They may also tell if they have driven the trail before, or if it's their first time. When a group approaches a really difficult obstacle, a few will get out and act as a spotter to ensure everyone makes it up or down safely.

Groups will usually stop around noon or 1:00 P.M. for a lunch break. Drivers and passengers usually chat, take pictures, or do some work on their Jeep/4X4 vehicle. Once lunch is completed they will take off again.

== Trails ==
Trails rank from easy to difficult (1 through 10). Circle is Easy, Square is Moderate, and Diamond is Hard. Many trails have several obstacles to get through. Some of the most famous are Hell's Revenge and Golden Spike.

== Usage ==
The Event is often attended by media representatives who cover outdoor and recreation events including representatives from Jeep. The Moab variant of the Jeep Wrangler is named after Moab, UT.

== See also ==
- The Lion's Back
