= List of San Francisco State Gators in the NFL draft =

This is a list of San Francisco State Gators football players in the NFL draft.

== Key ==
| B | Back | K | Kicker | NT | Nose tackle |
| C | Center | LB | Linebacker | FB | Fullback |
| DB | Defensive back | P | Punter | HB | Halfback |
| DE | Defensive end | QB | Quarterback | WR | Wide receiver |
| DT | Defensive tackle | RB | Running back | G | Guard |
| E | End | T | Offensive tackle | TE | Tight end |

| = Pro Bowler |
| = Hall of Famer |

== Selections ==
| Year | Round | Pick | Player | Team | Position |
|---|---|---|---|---|---|
| 1958 | 8 | 93 | Floyd Peters | Baltimore Colts | G |
| 1961 | 15 | 198 | Julius Varnado | Dallas Cowboys | T |
| 1961 | 16 | 220 | Charley Fuller | San Francisco 49ers | RB |
| 1963 | 20 | 271 | D. L. Hurd | Baltimore Colts | E |
| 1966 | 14 | 208 | Elmer Collett | San Francisco 49ers | C |
| 1966 | 16 | 236 | Tom Piggee | Dallas Cowboys | RB |
| 1967 | 15 | 377 | Terry Oakes | Chicago Bears | DE |
| 1967 | 17 | 431 | Lyle Baucom | Washington Redskins | T |
| 1968 | 9 | 234 | Joe Koontz | New York Giants | WR |
| 1968 | 17 | 437 | Jim Schmidt | Atlanta Falcons | DE |
| 1972 | 7 | 178 | Dennis Pete | Oakland Raiders | DB |
| 1976 | 12 | 345 | Robert Sparks | Oakland Raiders | DB |
| 1976 | 15 | 410 | Rick Faulk | New York Jets | P |
| 1979 | 12 | 321 | Frank Duncan | San Diego Chargers | DB |
| 1991 | 7 | 175 | Doug Parrish | New York Jets | CB |
