= Ted Alflen =

American football player (born 1946)

No. 25
- Position: Halfback

Personal information
- Born: September 13, 1946 (age 80); Reno, Nevada
- Listed height: 6 ft 0 in (1.83 m)
- Listed weight: 195 lb (88 kg)

Career information
- College: Springfield

Career history
- Denver Broncos (1969); Long Island Bulls (1970); Montreal Alouettes (1970); New England Patriots (1971)

Awards and highlights
- Grey Cup champion (1970)
- Stats at Pro Football Reference

Theodore Thomas Alflen (born September 13, 1946) is an American former football player. A defensive back and halfback, he played college football at Springfield College, and played professionally in the American Football League (AFL) for the Denver Broncos in 1969 and in the Canadian Football League for the Montreal Alouettes in 1970. Alflen returned to the NFL to play with the New England Patriots in 1971, but suffered a knee injury returning a kickoff in the pre-season against the Minnesota Vikings. Nine weeks later he was released and retired due to numerous injuries.

Alflen held Springfield College's record for most points scored in a game, 36 versus Tufts in 1968, a record which stood until 2006.

== Montreal Alouettes and the 1970 Grey Cup ==
Alflen's moment in the limelight came during his short stint with Montreal. Alouettes coach Sam Etcheverry had suspended running back Dennis Duncan and receiver Bob McCarthy for curfew violations. Alflen, who had been playing for the Long Island Bulls, was brought in just in time for the playoffs, and played only three playoff games in his brief but noteworthy career as a Lark. During the first quarter of the 1970 Grey Cup game, the Alouettes were third-and-one at the Calgary Stampeders' ten-yard line. Alflen was sent in as a play courier with instructions for a hand-off up the middle to running back Moses Denson for the third-down gamble. Denson was forced wide to the right by Calgary's Terry Wilson. Wilson was flat on the ground but had Denson's ankle in his grip. Denson caught site of Alflen open downfield and launched a perfect strike. "I was blocking and saw Moses was in trouble. I headed for the end zone, he saw me and lofted a perfect pass to me. It was a magical sort of play; something instantaneous. It was an amazing moment for me."

== After football ==
After his football career, Alflen worked in sales for a chemical company, was an assistant football coach at Miami Edison High School in Miami, Florida, for two years, and then worked as director of sales and development for a sun-care products company. In 1991, Alflen founded a natural products company, Naturally Fresh Deodorant Crystal. He manufactured natural deodorants which were distributed in 60 countries and by most major US retailers. In October 2013, he sold the company, although he presently still a consultant for the company.

As of 2026, Alflen is the Chief Executive Officer for Skuze Shoes.

== See also ==
- List of American Football League players
