= Paradox Trail =

Hiking trail in the U.S. state of Colorado

- Nucla Range Trailhead (2026)
- Length: 118 miles
- Location: Montrose County, Colorado
- Trailheads: Kokopelli Trail, Colorado; Tabeguache Trail, Colorado
- Use: Mountain biking and hiking
- Elevation change: 9,500 – 4,800 ft.
- Highest point: Uncompahgre Plateau, 9,500 ft (2,900 m)
- Lowest point: Dolores River 4,800 ft (1,500 m)
- Difficulty: Strenuous
- Season: Early spring to late fall
- Sights: High desert environments with broad cliff faces, deep arroyos and riparian habitats
- Hazards: Wilderness characteristics — carry water, food, map and GPS

The Paradox Trail is a hiking and mountain biking trail located in western Montrose County, Colorado, United States, which traverses a route of over 118 miles (190 km) through various terrain. The trail was rerouted 17 miles due to a trespass issue near the Tabeguache area north of Nucla in 2017. The trail links with two other long-distance trails in the region: the Tabeguache Trail to the east on the Uncompahgre Plateau and the Kokopelli Trail to the west in the La Sal Mountains of Utah. These three trails together form the "Grand Loop", a grueling 360-mile (580 km) course.

== History ==
The 118-mile (190 km) trail was established in 1995 by the Colorado Plateau Mountain Bike Trail Association, Montrose West Recreation, the US Forest Service and the Bureau of Land Management. Funding for the 17-mile reroute project came from the Telluride Foundation, the Colorado Historical Society, Montrose County, and the Colorado Parks and Wildlife Trails Grant fund and brought the Paradox Trail within a quarter of a mile of the Town of Nucla.

== Route description ==
Most of the trail is a two-track path ranging in altitude from 9,500 feet (2,900 m) on the Uncompahgre Plateau to the lower elevations of 4,800 ft (1,500 m) along the Dolores River. Some areas qualify as single-track because of the trail width and there are at least five "hike-a-bike" sections to be negotiated. While there are trail sections that utilize some seasonally graded county roads, much of the Paradox Trail is inaccessible to motorized vehicles, although vehicle access points exist at many places. Wildlife such as elk, mountain lions, coyotes, and rattlesnakes abound throughout the region traversed by the trail.
