= Zane Taylor (American football) =

American football player (born 1988)

No. 60, 63
- Position: Center

Personal information
- Born: April 23, 1988 (age 38); Murray, Utah, U.S.
- Listed height: 6 ft 2 in (1.88 m)
- Listed weight: 309 lb (140 kg)

Career information
- High school: Grand County (Moab, Utah)
- College: Utah
- NFL draft: 2011: undrafted

Career history
- New York Jets (2011)*; Tampa Bay Buccaneers (2011)*; Philadelphia Eagles (2011–2012)*; Indianapolis Colts (2012)*
- * Offseason or practice squad member only

Awards and highlights
- First-team All-MW (2010); Second-team All-MW (2009)
- Stats at Pro Football Reference

Zane Taylor (born April 23, 1988) is an American former professional football center. He went undrafted in the 2011 NFL draft but was signed by the New York Jets and released following the preseason. He also spent time on the Tampa Bay Buccaneers, Indianapolis Colts and Philadelphia Eagles. He played college football at Utah.

== Early life ==
Taylor grew up in Moab, Utah. He was a multi-sport star and led Grand County High School to its first state football championship.

== College career ==
Taylor played college football as the starting center for the University of Utah Utes football team from 2008 to 2010. In August 2009, a feature story written by Taylor about summer football workouts was published by The Wall Street Journal. He was a second-team All-MWC selection as a junior, and a first-team honoree as a senior. As a senior, he was also selected for the Outland Trophy watchlist, and as a finalist for the 2010 Lowe's Senior CLASS Award, awarded to a student-athlete for excellence in community, classroom, character and competition.

== Professional career ==
=== New York Jets ===
Although he went undrafted in the NFL draft, Taylor impressed scouts at Utah's Pro Day and at the NFL scouting combine. In August 2011, he signed a contract to play professional football for the New York Jets. On September 3, the Jets released Taylor.

=== Tampa Bay Buccaneers ===
Taylor was signed to the practice squad on September 28, 2011 but was later released.

=== Philadelphia Eagles ===
The Philadelphia Eagles signed Taylor to their practice squad on November 23, 2011. At the conclusion of the 2011 season, his practice squad contract expired and he became a free agent. He was re-signed to the active roster on January 2, 2012. He was waived on May 17, 2012.

=== Indianapolis Colts ===
Taylor was claimed by the Indianapolis Colts on waivers, on May 18, 2012. Following the 2012 preseason Taylor was released by the Colts.
