= Joe Koontz =

American football player (born 1945)

No. 47
- Position: Wide receiver

Personal information
- Born: August 13, 1945 (age 81); Visalia, California, U.S.
- Listed height: 6 ft 1 in (1.85 m)
- Listed weight: 192 lb (87 kg)

Career information
- High school: De Anza (Richmond, California)
- College: San Francisco State
- NFL draft: 1968: 9th round, 234th overall pick

Career history
- New York Giants (1968); Long Island Bulls (1969)
- Stats at Pro Football Reference

Joseph William Koontz (born August 13, 1945) is an American former professional football wide receiver who played one season for the New York Giants. He was selected by the Giants in the ninth round of the 1968 NFL draft. He played in all 14 games, and had 1 kick return. He also played for the ACFL Long Island Bulls in 1969.
