= William Grandstaff =

Cowboy, soldier, prospector, rancher, and businessman

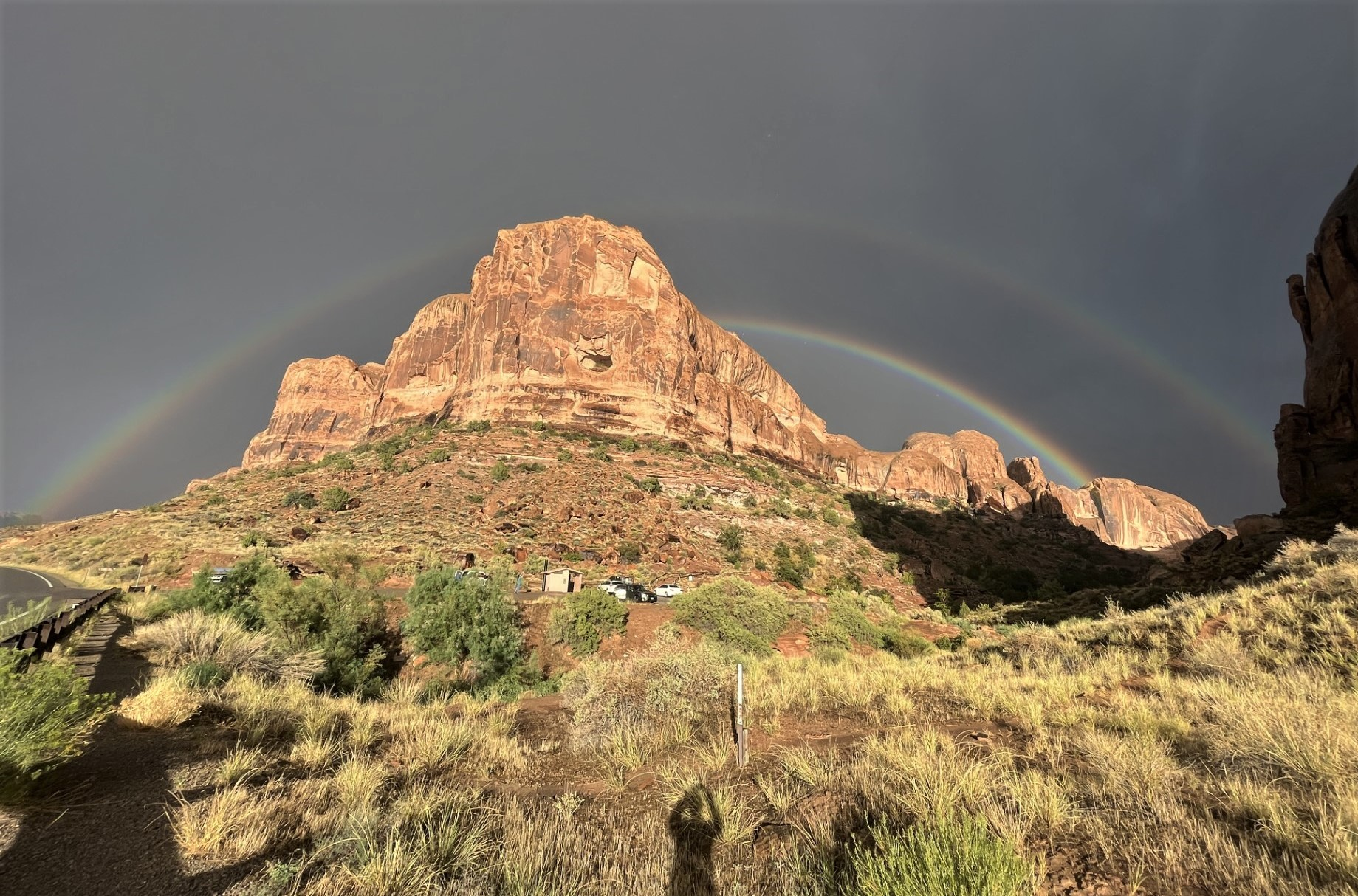
Rainbows at the trailhead of Grandstaff Canyon, named for William Grandstaff

William Grandstaff (~1830s or 1840s – 1901) was an American cowboy and frontiersman who lived in Ohio before settling in Utah Territory and Colorado. Born into slavery, verified information about Grandstaff's life is sporadic, but he's believed to have served in the Black Brigade of Cincinnati during the Civil War; to have been one of the two first successful non-indigenous settlers of Moab, Utah; and to have been well-respected in his community when he died near Glenwood Springs in 1901. He is the namesake of Moab's Grandstaff Canyon, and in recent years has received renewed attention from historians and artists.

== Life ==
=== Early Life and War Service ===
William Grandstaff was born enslaved at some point during the 1830s or 1840s. Differing records mark his place of birth as either having been in Virginia or Alabama. He is thought to have been of mixed race. He either escaped or was released from slavery at some time during the 1850s.

Grandstaff moved to Cincinnati and married a woman named Isabella Bond in 1857, with whom he had two children before (likely) divorcing by 1868. During the Civil War, Grandstaff was a member of the Black Brigade of Cincinnati, a military unit composed of African Americans who were at first forcibly conscripted before the unit was reorganized to accept enlistment on a voluntary basis, and which was the first of its kind organized by the Union Army. Since the Confederate Army never directly assaulted Cincinnati, the unit—and presumably Grandstaff—never saw combat, although Grandstaff would likely have been engaged in rigorous work aiding construction of fortifications surrounding the city; the redoubts the brigade built were a principal factor dissuading General Henry Heth from mounting an offense upon Cincinnati.

=== Settlement of Moab And Flight Therefrom, 1877–1881 ===
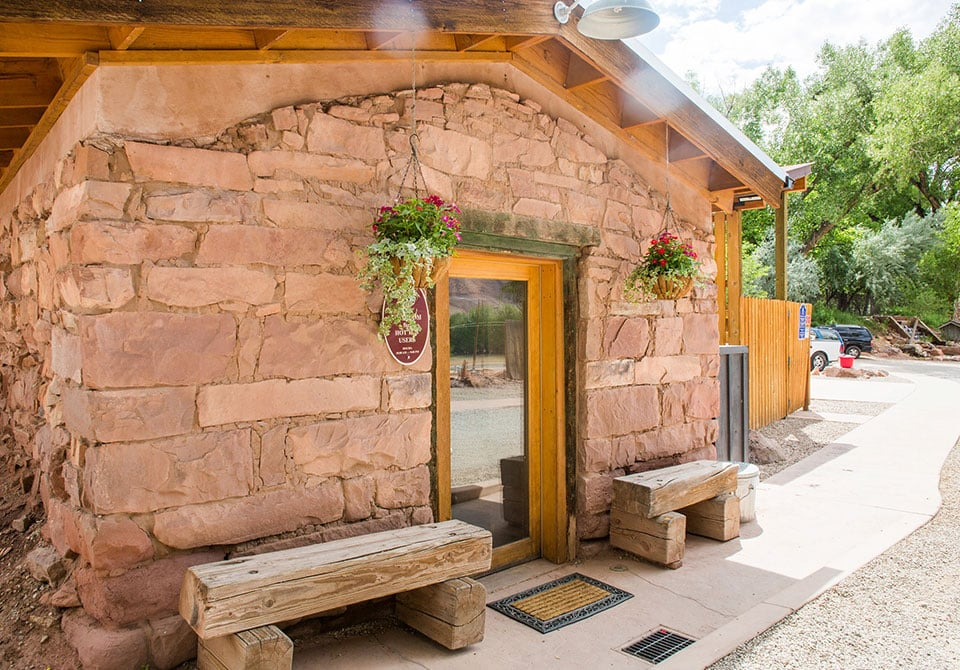
An ice house built in Moab, Utah by William Grandstaff; now somewhat refurbished.

Following a possible foray in Omaha, Grandstaff traveled to Utah Territory in 1877, where (accompanied by a French-Canadian trapper known to posterity simply as "Frenchie") he occupied the by-then abandoned fort of the Elk Mountain Mission, a Mormon settlement in present-day Moab whose original inhabitants had been driven out by the local Ute people in 1855 when the former attempted to usurp land of key agricultural importance to the latter. Having brought little besides a single pack donkey to a desert location that then provided little food, the pair, who had come to prospect in the area, only survived at first by eating a lone cow that had been left behind at the fort by a previous pair of settlers: the brothers Silas and George Green, who had been killed while trying to resettle the same empty fort, likely by the Ute. After agreeing to divide the space of the valley as well as the grounds of the fort into equal parcels for each to separately occupy and lay claim, Grandstaff and Frenchie then sustained themselves by growing watermelon, squash, and corn. Grandstaff had meanwhile discovered what remained of the Elk Mountain Mission's and Green Brothers' relict cattle, which he then rounded up and kept penned within the slot canyon that would later bear his name. He also may have distilled his own liquor and traded it to the Ute, who purportedly took a substantially greater liking to Grandstaff than they had ever had to Moab's earlier white and Mormon settlers.

A latter wave of Mormon families migrating eastward from the north and center of Utah began to arrive in the valley in the autumn of 1878; the first of these stopped at the mission fort, where Grandstaff and Frenchie invited them to dine on what little they had. The Mormons, for their part, mixed characteristic flapjacks for the meal; these latter the cowboy and trapper consumed quite ravenously, prompting one Fred Powell, noticing the bounty of squash gourds lying near the table in a neglected pile, to ask the pair why they hadn't added these to the supper. Grandstaff's reply is perhaps the longest extant quotation directly attributed to the frontiersman:

"Good Lord, man, my partner and I have lived on the doubly condemned things all summer. We waited for someone to come along with flour and were ready to trade the entire garden for a small sack of it; we are done with squash for all time."

An embarrassment of squash, such as with Bill and Frenchie might have been beset during their occupancy of the Elk Mountain Mission Fort.

The Mormon newcomers themselves craved fresh produce after weeks of dry trail-rations: predictably, the pioneers and the prospectors traded their foodstuffs to mutual satisfaction, and continued doing so as long as both parties remained in the valley. This last mentioned condition, however, was not to endure.

At some point that same autumn, a new settler called John Shafer stayed in the fort with Grandstaff and Frenchie. Shafer claimed that during his stay, Frenchie attempted to murder Grandstaff, the latter being just barely saved when Shafer "knocked the gun away" from Frenchie. Regardless of what may have truly occurred, Frenchie did flee the fort, and for a time trapped fur downstream the Colorado before ultimately selling his parcel of the valley, absconding from the historical record as well as from Moab. By 1881, Grandstaff had also moved out of the abandoned fort to settle a ranch on a nearby patch of land adjoining a natural spring, on which he constructed a collection of dwellings; two of these — an ice house and a smokehouse, each built of sandstone hewn with competent masonry — stand to this day.

The same year, a battle broke out in nearby Castle Valley between newer white settlers and a small coalition of Ute, Paiute, and Diné warriors. The fight was essentially a victory for the indigenous, who lost only two men, whereas ten white gunmen died. The white posse, among whom was a cousin of the slain Green Brothers, may also have come into near-violent conflict with a few companies of Buffalo Soldiers during their return journey from the battle. Prior to the shootout, angry rumors about Grandstaff's putative bootlegging to the local Ute (rumors no doubt invigorated not only by the growing tensions between the local white and indigenous populations, but also by widespread knowledge of the mutual amity between Grandstaff and the local tribes) had already begun to mill around what was by then the town of Moab. That Grandstaff was well-apprised of these scurrilities and the violent intent they bore is evidenced in the following remark he is reported to have made to a friend at that time:

"The men are gathering up guns to go on the mountain to hunt Indians, but I think I'm the Indian they are after."

Thus, in the aftermath of the violence, fearing he would be used as a scapegoat for the whites' defeat in battle and lynched, Grandstaff escaped Moab on horseback: his flight was so hasty that he was forced to leave his cattle behind.

=== Flourishing in Colorado And Later Life ===
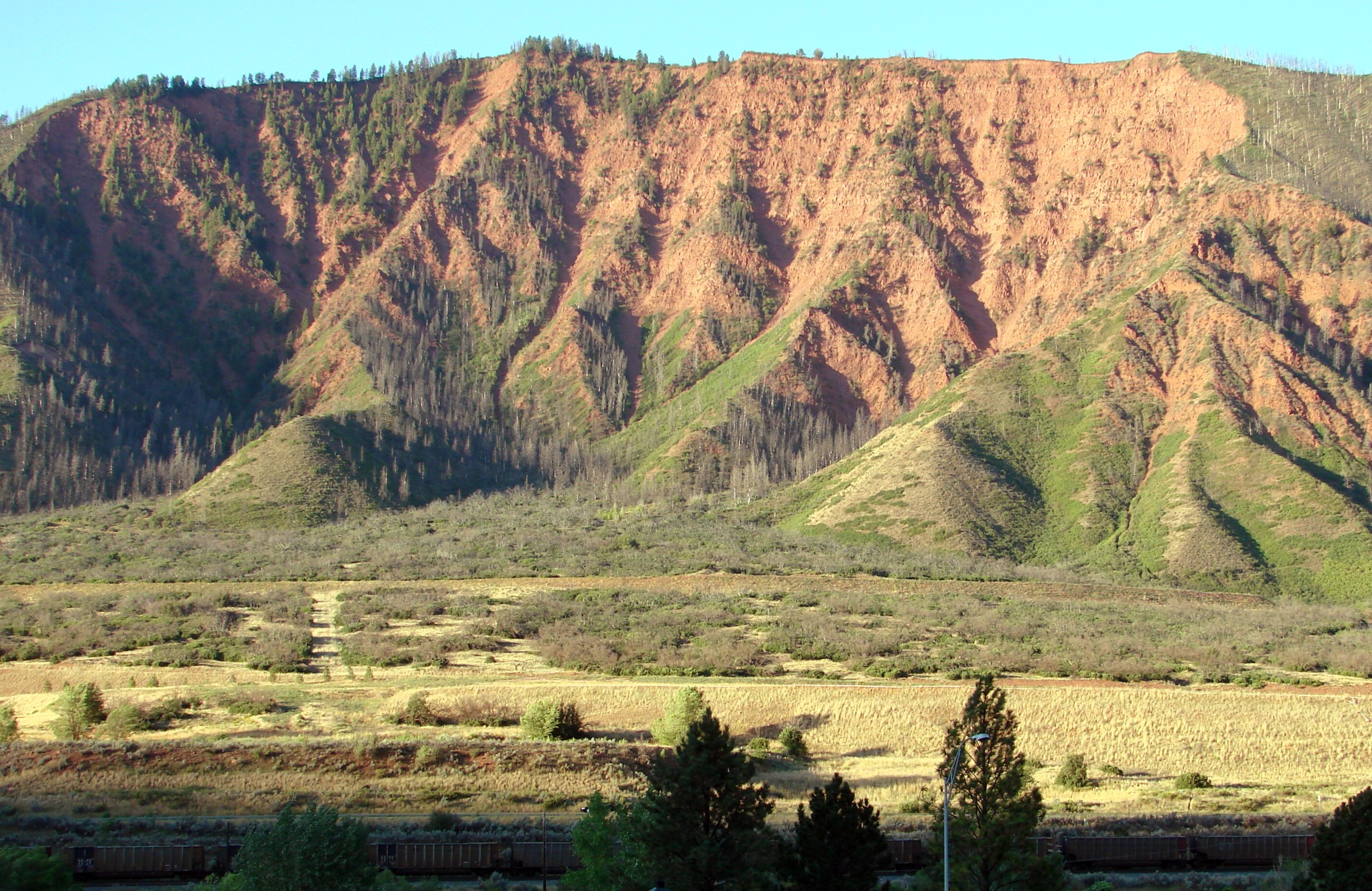
Pictured is Red Mountain, which rises over Glenwood Springs. William Grandstaff lived atop Red Mountain during his happy latter years.

Grandstaff's horse broke a leg upon reaching a place called Cane Springs; Grandstaff euthanized the steed with a bullet to the head before walking the remaining distance to Salida, Colorado. There Grandstaff lived for a time, and ran a bootblack stand.

At some point, Grandstaff moved to Glenwood Springs, where he came to live in a cabin atop the adjacent Red Mountain (a dwelling into which Grandstaff constructed an especially narrow entrance to impede home invasions on the part of Satan), from which he resumed prospecting, and erected atop the mountain a tremendous cross by affixing a crossbeam to a standing tree. In Glenwood Springs, Grandstaff married again, opened a saloon, ran a hot springs, mined, and in 1889 was on the ballot for the town's election for constable, by which time Grandstaff had long been a widely known and appreciated member of the community, affectionately called "Old Portugee". Grandstaff apparently became somewhat withdrawn after his second wife Rebecca died in 1895, and although he remained involved in local affairs, spent increasingly long periods alone in his mountain cabin.

In 1901, after a particularly long absence from town, a local boy was sent up to Grandstaff's cabin to ascertain his whereabouts; there Grandstaff was found dead of natural causes. It was reported that his corpse and the bed upon which it lay were "literally alive with maggots", and that, though devil-proof, the unusually narrow entrance into the cabin made it impossible to transport the body out upon the mattress, so that undertakers had to drag the remains outside by means of a rope. Those involved in this literal undertaking determined to disinfect Grandstaff's empty cabin, which they then proceeded to burn to the ground. The pillar of smoke that rose from the mountain at that spot was visible to the town below for many hours.

William Grandstaff's funeral was well-attended, and was reported in the local newspapers as an affecting event in the community.

== Legacy ==
Recent research into the life of William Grandstaff has been divulged by genealogist Nick Sheedy and shared by historical associations in Utah such as the Moab Museum.

The Grandstaff trail in Glenwood Springs runs in the area of Grandstaff's Red Mountain cabin.

The cross that Grandstaff installed upon Red Mountain eventually gave way, but Glenwood Springs residents at some point replaced its remains with a large electrically-lit cross that remains on the mountain to this day, maintained by a small private association that activates the cross's lights on holidays.

Grandstaff's old ranch dwellings are maintained by Moab Springs Ranch in Moab, Utah.

== Grandstaff Canyon ==
The canyon in Moab in which Grandstaff ranched cattle came to be named for him, though the particular manner of that naming has been historically fraught. Soon after Grandstaff left Moab, the same white settlers whose hostility drove Grandstaff from the area named the canyon after a nickname for Grandstaff that involved use of the n-word; the name was changed to "Negro Bill Canyon" in the 1960s, and finally to "Grandstaff Canyon" in 2017.

== See also ==
- Black Cowboys
- History of African Americans in Utah
