= Suicide of Terry Rossland =

Suicide of an American man from Butte, Montana

Terry Rossland
- Terry Rossland sitting in his car moments before the explosion
- Born: Terry Lee Rossland; June 21, 1952; Silver Bow County, Montana, U.S.
- Died: October 9, 1990 (aged 38); Butte, Montana, U.S.
- Cause of death: Suicide by drug overdose
- Children: 1

Terry Lee Rossland (June 21, 1952 – October 9, 1990) was an American man from Butte, Montana, known for loading his car full of gasoline and pipe bombs in 1989, and then detonating the bombs in his car while seated inside it. Rossland was attempting suicide due to personal issues he was facing at the time. He managed to survive the suicide attempt, but he successfully took his life a year later by a drug overdose. His suicide attempt in his car is well known as it was filmed by bystanders. Numerous television programs relating to crime and extraordinary events caught on camera have featured the footage of the explosion. To this day, the footage is still used in law enforcement training.

== Suicide attempt ==
On December 20, 1989, Rossland, a man with a history of mental illness, loaded his 1982 Dodge Colt Hatchback full of gasoline and pipe bombs with the intention of committing suicide. Rossland was depressed over his pending divorce with his wife and was despondent over the marital problems he was facing. Earlier that same day, his wife had obtained a restraining order to keep him away from her and their 15-year-old son. Rossland had also recently lost his job, and was unstable due to the amount of painkillers he had taken. He attracted the attention of authorities by robbing an Osco Drug store pharmacy of diazepam and codeine in the Butte Plaza on Harrison Avenue. He then led police on a thirty-minute chase at slow speed. He drove to an Uptown street in Butte, Montana, where police cordoned off his vehicle. When police surrounded his car, Rossland revealed it was loaded with pipe bombs and gasoline. Rossland demanded to speak to his wife and son, and threatened to take his own life if his demands were not met. Police locked down the entire area and a standoff began. As it was five days before Christmas, the area was packed with people doing their Christmas shopping. Bystanders watched the event unfold and began filming the incident. Sheriff Bob Butorovich, Lieutenant Bob Lee and Sergeant Dan Hollis, all of whom had known Rossland for years and were friends with him, approached his car and began negotiating with him. Butorovich spoke with Rossland while Lee deflated one of Rossland's tires to stop him from fleeing. Forty-five minutes passed and after repeated attempts to get Rossland to surrender, Rossland finally detonated the pipe bombs and the car exploded. Butorovich and Lee were both standing directly next to the car as it exploded. They managed to escape with only minor injuries. After the explosion, Rossland managed to survive as well, but he was set ablaze and was in excruciating pain. He opened his car door and fled on foot while still on fire. Fire crews rushed to Rossland's aid and put out the fire. The fire in Rossland's vehicle then spread to the back of his car and caused the remaining pipe bombs to explode. Rossland received emergency medical care and survived the suicide attempt, despite over seventy percent of his body being burned.

== Death ==
Rossland was flown to a specialist burn unit several states away and went through months of intensive care. Rossland spent more than three months in the burn unit at the University of Utah's medical center in Salt Lake City. While there, he underwent skin-graft surgery at least three times. Rossland was later transferred to the Galen campus of Montana State Hospital. Afterward, he was extradited back to Butte to stand trial for his crime. Butorovich personally escorted Rossland back through the airport when he returned.

Rossland was due to face trial in late 1990. He faced numerous criminal charges, including attempted deliberate homicide. However, before his trial even began, Rossland took his own life by a drug overdose. He was on leave from a physical rehab facility and died at his home in Butte on October 9, 1990. The day of his death, he reportedly called Dan Hollis, one of the officers who had tried to negotiate his surrender prior to the detonation during his initial suicide attempt. When he answered, Officer Hollis informed Rossland that he could not speak to him due to the upcoming trial, to which Rossland replied, "This is not going to trial." Police were called to his home shortly thereafter and found Rossland dead inside a shed behind his house having died due to an overdose of medication. He was 38 years old.

Lieutenant Bob Lee, one of the other police officers who had also negotiated with Rossland during the incident, died on December 6, 2013, at the age of 68. Sheriff Robert Butorovich died on August 17, 2020, at the age of 87.

== In popular culture ==
The footage of Rossland exploding his car and attempting suicide has been shown on many television programs relating to crime and extraordinary events caught on camera. It has been shown on: Reality TV, World's Wildest Police Videos (Season 3, Episode 9), World's Most Amazing Videos (Season 1, Episode 1), World's Most Dangerous Police Videos, the History Channel, Shockwave, the 1993 shockumentary film, Traces of Death, and the 1998 shockumentary film, Banned from Television. It was also shown widely on the news at the time of the event.
