= The Lion's Back =

Coordinates: 38°34′45″N 109°31′47″W

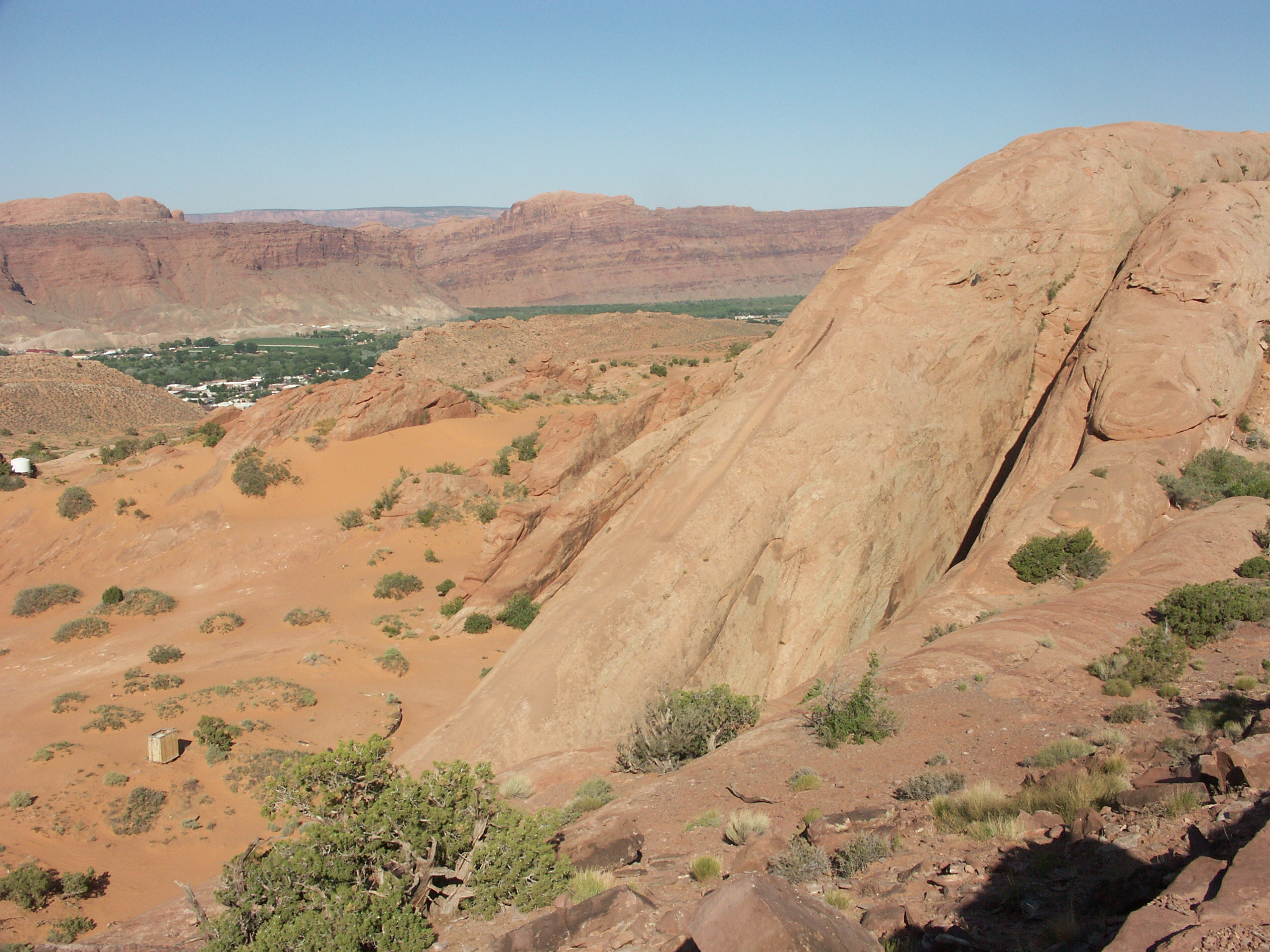
The Lion's Back

The Lion's Back is a sandstone ridge in Moab, Utah that used to be popular among drivers of four-wheel drive (4x4) vehicles. It has been closed to the public since 2004. It features a 65º incline and is 350 feet tall.

== Crash ==
The hill was the site of an accident in which a Chevrolet Blazer 4x4 lost its brakes and rolled uncontrollably down the hill, plunging 30 feet to the ground. The accident was caught on home video and has been featured on TV shows including Real TV, Shockwave, When Vacations Attack, and Maximum Exposure.

== Development ==
In 2021, the Moab City Council voted to approve Lionsback Resort, a housing development and hotel.
