= Grandstaff Canyon =

Canyon in Grand County, Utah, United States

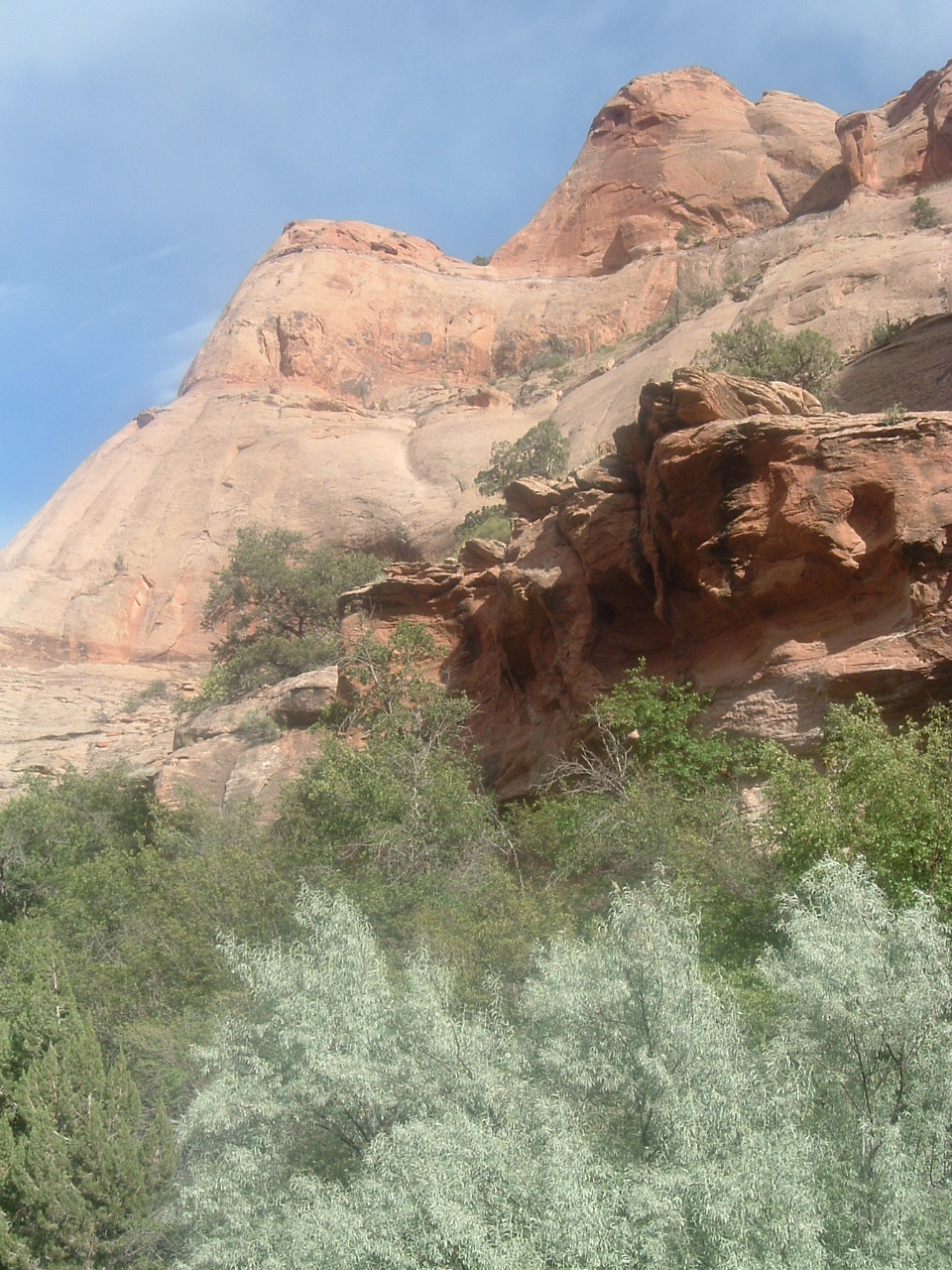
- A typical scene in Grandstaff Canyon

- Location within Utah Location within the United States Location within North America
- Floor elevation: Approx. 4,309 feet (1,300 m)

Geography
- Location: Grand County
- Country: United States
- Coordinates: 38.6°N 109.5°W
- Rivers: Colorado River
- Interactive map of Grandstaff Canyon

Grandstaff Canyon (called Nigger Bill Canyon from the late 19th century until the 1960s, and Negro Bill Canyon until 2017) is a canyon in southern Grand County, Utah, United States. It is part of the Colorado River watershed. Its stream flows directly into the main channel of the Colorado River within Moab Canyon.

== Description ==
A trailhead which gives hiking access into the canyon is located directly adjacent to Utah State Route 128 (SR‑128). The trailhead is located about three miles (4.8 km) east of the junction of SR‑128 and U.S. Route 191. The Morning Glory Natural Bridge is located in the canyon about 2.5 miles (4.0 km) from the trailhead and has a length of 943 feet (287 m).

== Naming history ==
Grandstaff Canyon was named after William Grandstaff, a mixed-race cowboy, who prospected and ran cattle in the desert canyon in the late 1870s with a Canadian trapper named Frenchie. They took joint possession of the abandoned Elk Mountain Mission fort near Moab after 1877, and each controlled part of the Spanish Valley. Grandstaff fled the area in 1881 after being charged with bootlegging whiskey to the Indians. Grandstaff later lived near Glenwood Springs, Colorado, and died in 1901.

The canyon was called Nigger Bill Canyon until the 1960s, when the revised name Negro Bill Canyon was adopted. In the wake of the 2015 Charleston church shooting, local councilwoman Mary McGann called for the renaming of the canyon to the more formal Grandstaff Canyon. Although the local NAACP chapter was behind its renaming in the 1960s, they opposed the further change to Grandstaff Canyon. Jeanetta Williams, president of the Salt Lake City NAACP chapter, insisted that "Negro is an acceptable word" and feared that "If the name changes, it's going to lose its history". However, in 2017 the U.S. Board on Geographic Names voted to have it renamed to Grandstaff Canyon.

== See also ==
- List of canyons and gorges in Utah
- List of longest natural arches
