= Grand County High School =

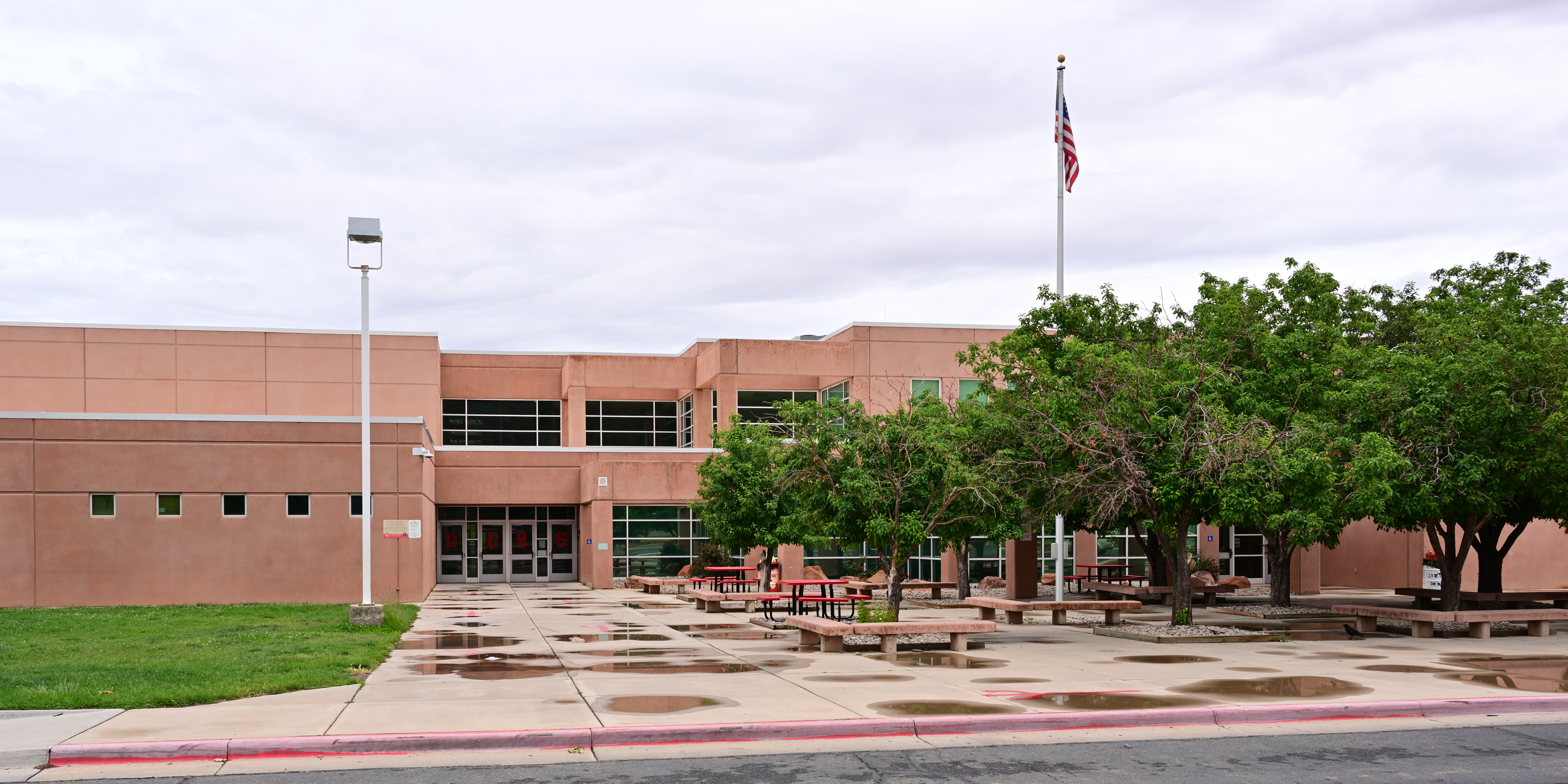

Location
- 608 S. 400 E. Moab, Utah; United States; 38°33′54″N 109°32′44″W

Information
- Type: Public High School
- Motto: "Together We Are Grand”
- Established: 1919
- School district: Grand County School District
- Principal: Todd Thompson
- Teaching staff: 27.81 (FTE)
- Grades: 9 - 12
- Gender: Co-ed
- Enrollment: 453 (2023-2024)
- Student to teacher ratio: 16.29
- Campus: Rural
- Campus size: 12 acres (4.9 ha)
- Colors: Red and white
- Mascot: Red Devils
- Newspaper: The Devil's Advocate
- Yearbook: Mograndah
- Communities served: Moab, Castle Valley, Thompson Springs
- Website: gchs.grandschools.org

Grand County High School is the only high school in Grand County School District in Moab, Utah, USA. It enrolls over 400 students in grades 9-12 from Moab, Castle Valley, and Thompson Springs in Grand County and Spanish Valley in San Juan County. The average graduating class is around 100 students.

== Athletics ==
- Cheerleading
- Drill Team
- School band
- Choir
- Drama
- Debating

=== Fall sports ===
- American football
- Boys' and girls' cross country running
- Boys' golf
- Girls' soccer
- Girls' tennis
- Girls' volleyball

=== Winter sports ===
- Wrestling
- Boys' and girls' basketball
- Boys' and girls' swimming

=== Spring sports ===
- Boys' baseball
- Boys' soccer
- Girls' softball
- Boys' tennis
- Boys' and girls' track and field
- Girls' golf

== Student clubs ==
- Amigos Club
- Art Club
- Debate and Speech Society
- Drama Club
- FCCLA
- FFA
- Indoor Soccer
- National Honor Society
- Recycling Club
- Student Government
- Student newspaper
