= Long Island Bulls =

Defunct American football team

- Founded: 1969
- Folded: 1970
- League: Atlantic Coast Football League
- Based in: Long Island, New York
- Stadium: Hofstra University Stadium
- Championships: 0

The Long Island Bulls were a minor league American football team based on Long Island, New York. They played two seasons in the Atlantic Coast Football League (ACFL) in from 1969 to 1970 and played their home games at Hofstra University Stadium in Hempstead, New York. 1970 Grey Cup game hero Ted Alflen played for the team in 1970.
