= Moab, Utah =

City in the United States

Moab
- City
- City of Moab
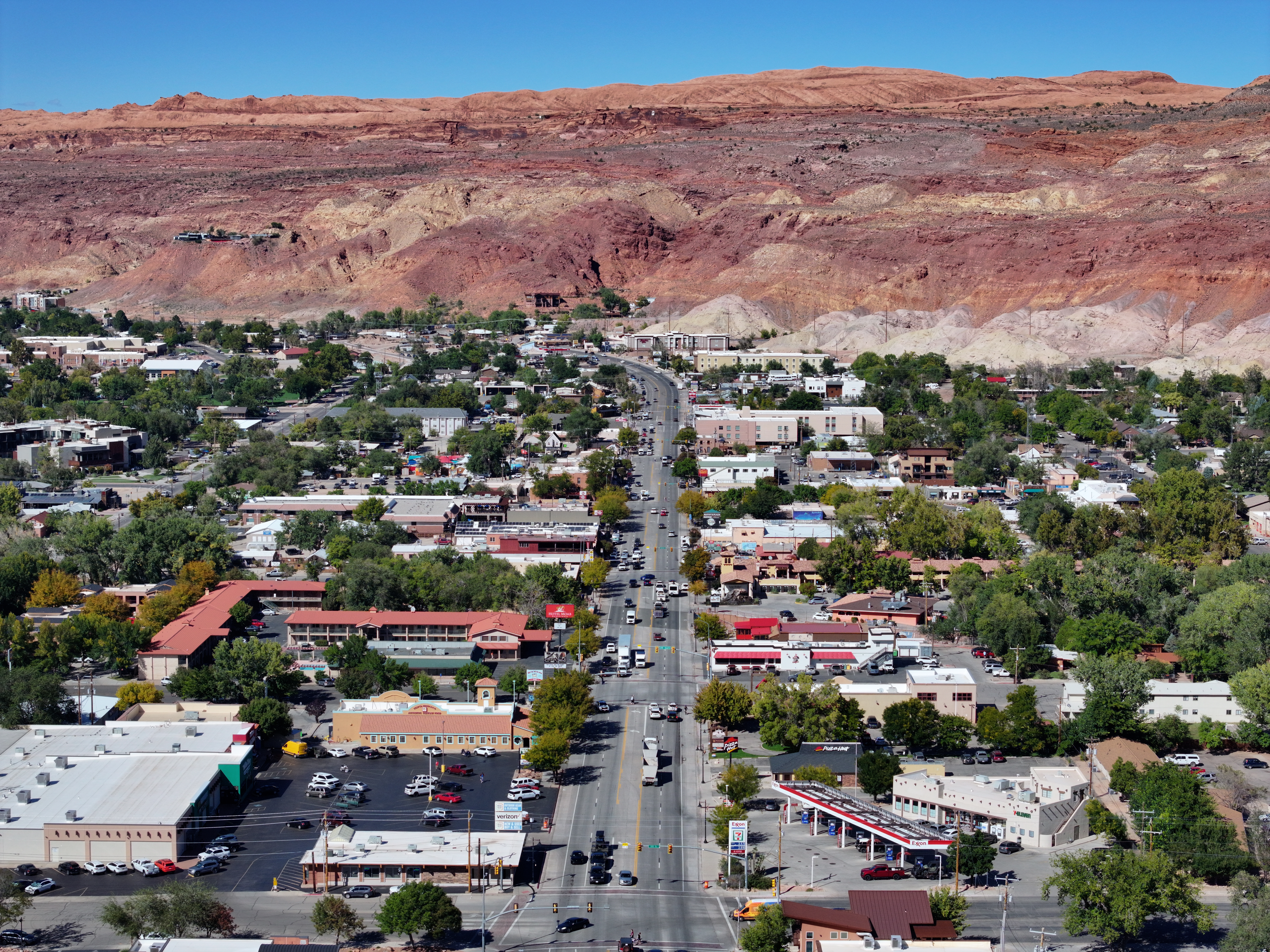
- Downtown Moab, Utah

- Location in Grand County and the state of Utah
- Coordinates: 38°34′21″N 109°32′59″W
- Country: United States of America
- State: Utah
- County: Grand
- Settled: 1878
- Incorporated: December 30,1902
- Named for: Moab

Government
  - Type: Mayor/city council
  - Mayor: Joette Langianese

Area
  - Total: 4.80 sq mi (12.42 km^{2})
  - Land: 4.80 sq mi (12.42 km^{2})
  - Water: 0 sq mi (0.00 km^{2})
- Elevation: 4,026 ft (1,227 m)

Population (2020)
  - Total: 5,366
  - Density: 1,119.0/sq mi (432.05/km^{2})
- Time zone: UTC-7 (Mountain (MST))
  - Summer (DST): UTC-6 (MDT)
- ZIP Code: 84532
- Area code: 435
- FIPS code: 49-50700
- GNIS feature ID: 1430389
- Website: moabcity.gov

Moab (/ˈmoʊ.æb/) is the largest city in and the county seat of Grand County in eastern Utah in the western United States, known for its dramatic scenery. The population was 5,366 at the 2020 census. Moab attracts many tourists annually, mostly visitors to the nearby Arches and Canyonlands National Parks. The town is a popular base for mountain bikers who ride the extensive network of trails including the Slickrock Trail, and for off-roaders who come for the annual Moab Jeep Safari.

Moab is home to one of the nine regional campuses of Utah State University.

== History ==
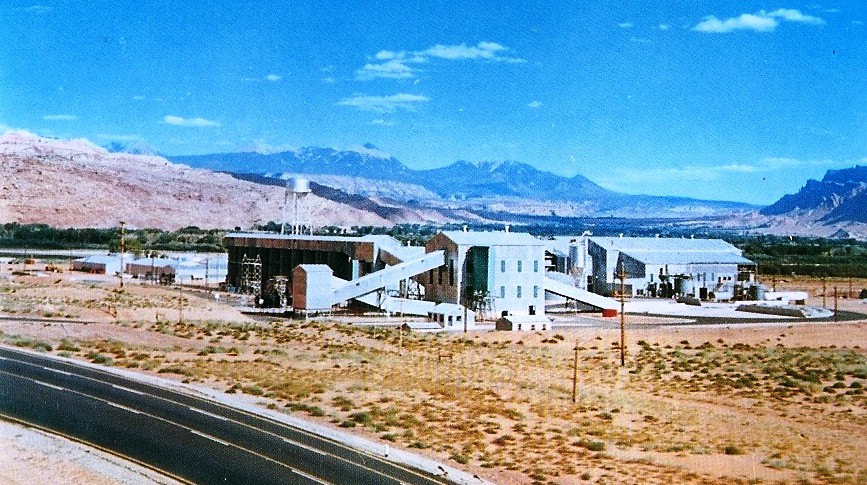
Charlie Steen's $11 million Uranium Reduction Co. that became the Atlas Uranium Mill

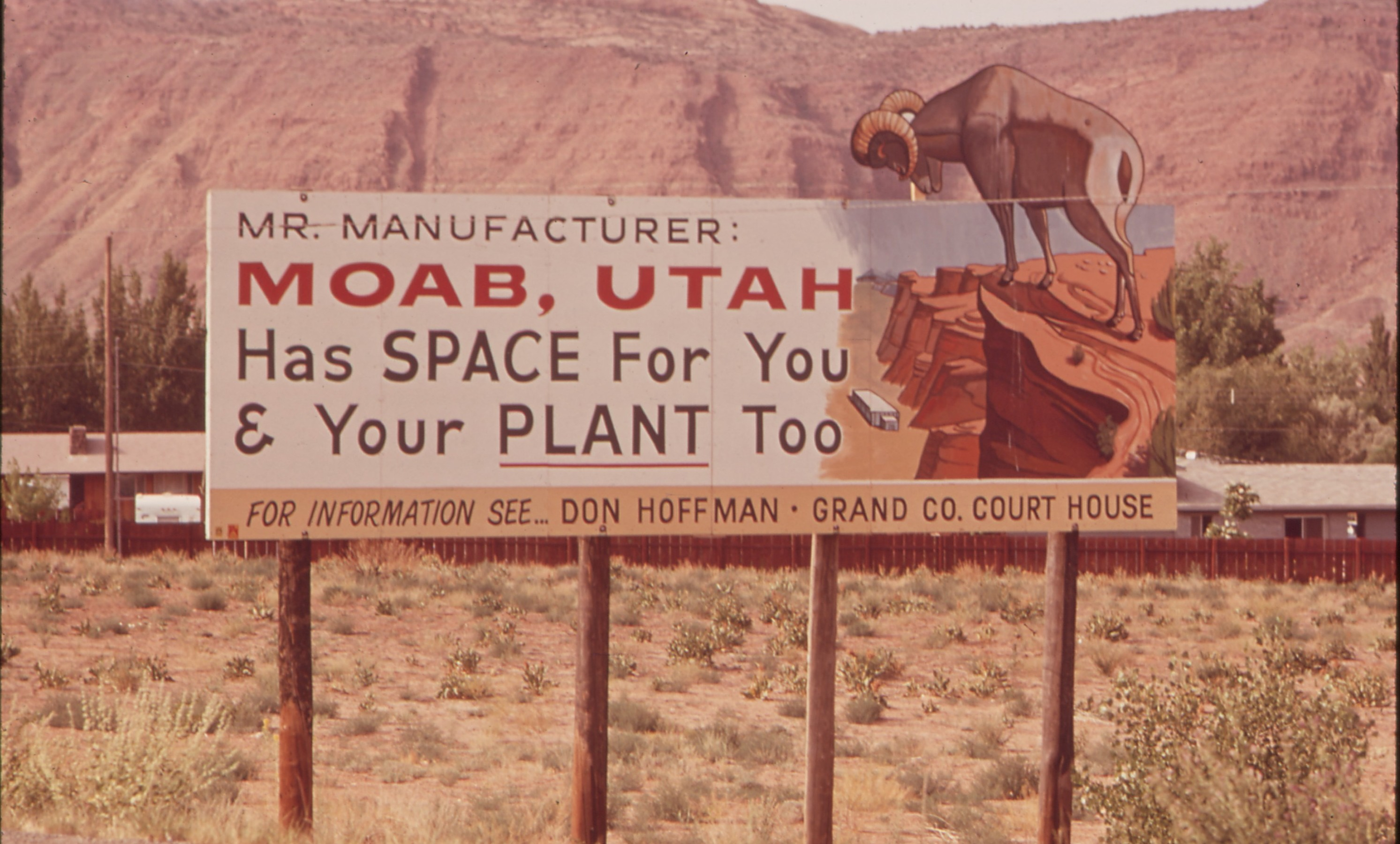
County-sponsored sign promoting manufacturing in Moab during the early 1970s

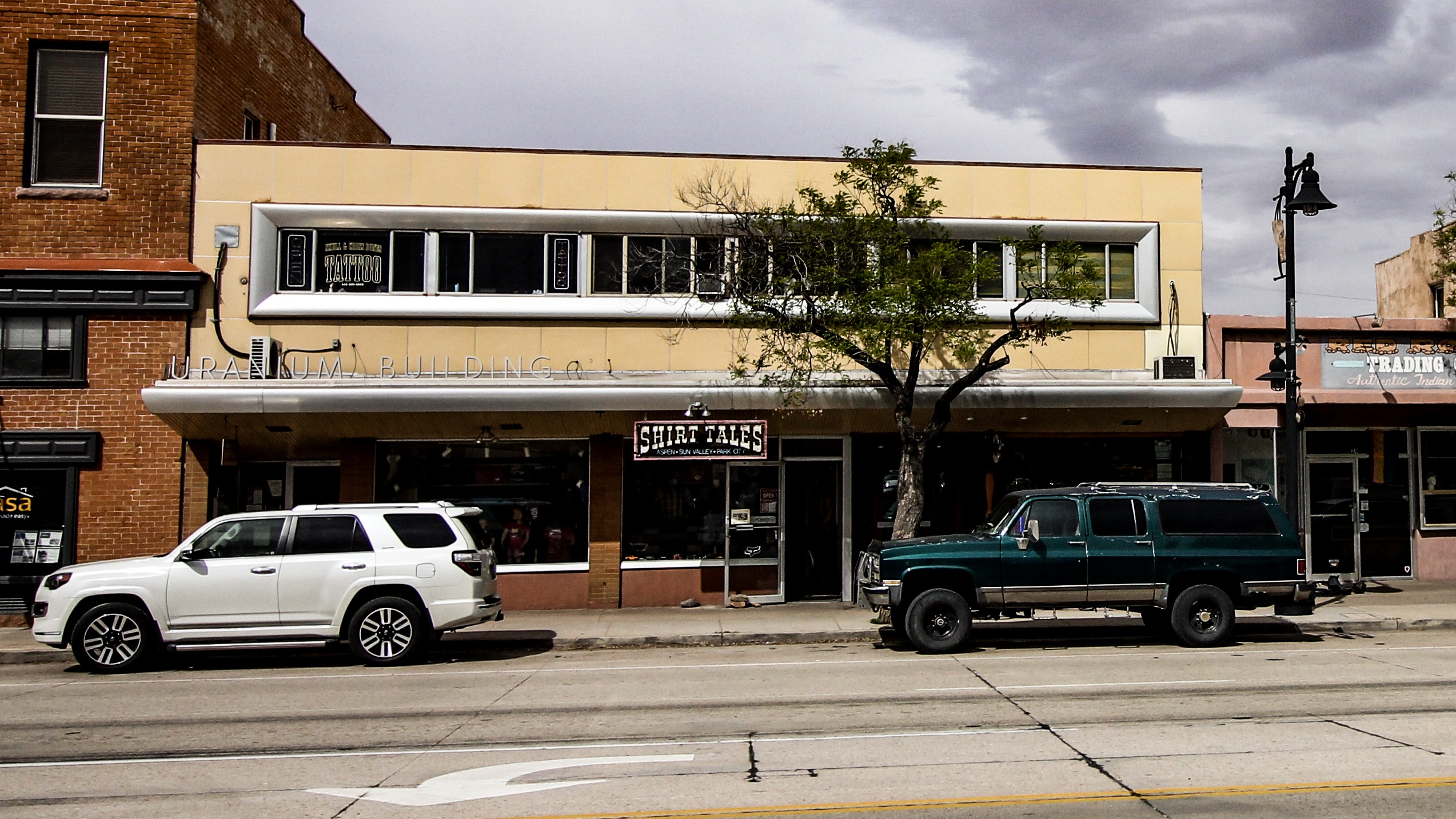
Uranium building's historic storefront

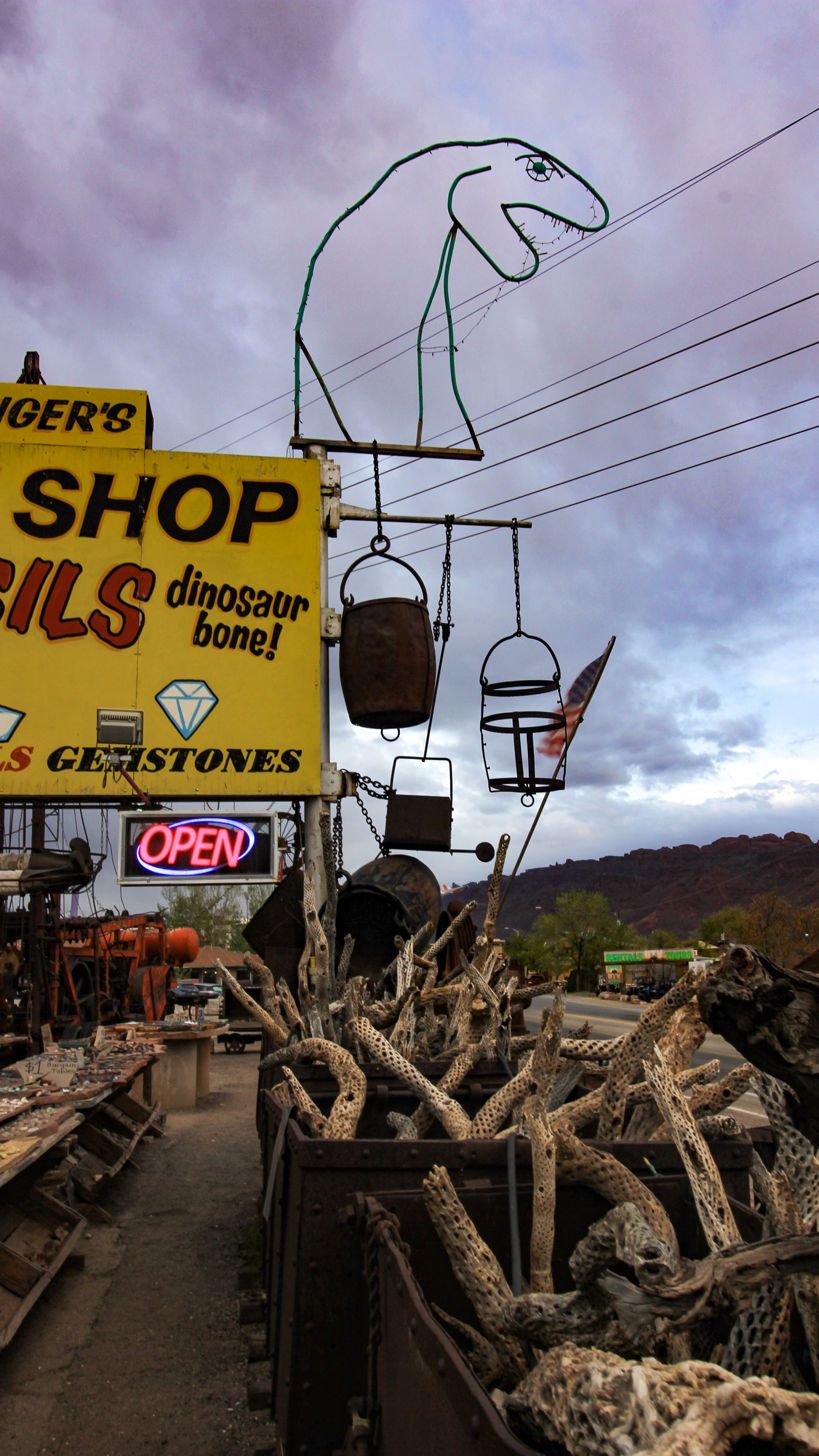
Lin Ottinger's rock shop

=== Early years ===
Residents named the town Moab in 1880; in the Bible this term refers to an area of land located on the eastern side of the Jordan River. Some historians believe the city in Utah came to use this name because of William Andrew Peirce, the first postmaster, believing that the biblical Moab and this part of Utah were both "the far country". However, others believe the name has Paiute origins, referring to the word moapa, meaning "mosquito". Some of the area's early residents attempted to change the city's name, because in the Christian Bible, Moabites are demeaned as incestuous and idolatrous (but note, Ruth was a Moabite). One petition in 1890 had 59 signatures and requested a name change to "Vina". Another effort attempted to change the name to "Uvadalia". Both attempts failed.

During the period between 1829 and the early 1850s, the area around what is now Moab served as the Colorado River crossing along the Old Spanish Trail. Latter-day Saint settlers attempted to establish a trading fort at the river crossing called the Elk Mountain Mission in April 1855 to trade with travellers attempting to cross the river. Forty men were called on this mission. There were repeated Indian attacks, including one on September 23, 1855, in which James Hunt, companion to Peter Stubbs, was shot and killed by a Native American. After this last attack, the fort was abandoned. The fort was resettled first by the brothers Silas and George Green, who were also killed by the Ute, before being settled again in 1877 by the mixed-race cowboy William Grandstaff and a fur trapper named "Frenchie". Frenchie would later leave the area, but Grandstaff remained as Moab's first successful non-indigenous settler, having moved out of the derelict Elk Mountain Mission to construct his own ranch, growing garden vegetables and keeping cattle penned in a nearby canyon. A new group of settlers from Rich County, led by Randolph Hockaday Stewart, arrived in 1878 under the direction of Brigham Young. Racial animosity from these same settlers drove Grandstaff from town in 1881. Moab was incorporated as a town on December 30, 1902.

In 1883 the Denver and Rio Grande Western Railroad main line was constructed across eastern Utah. The rail line did not pass through Moab, instead passing through the towns of Thompson Springs 38 mi (61 km) and Cisco, 47 miles (76 km) to the north. Later, other places to cross the Colorado were constructed, such as Lee's Ferry, Navajo Bridge and Boulder Dam. These changes shifted the trade routes away from Moab. Moab farmers and merchants had to adapt from trading with passing travelers to shipping their goods to distant markets. Soon Moab's origins as one of the few natural crossings of the Colorado River were forgotten. Nevertheless, the U.S. military deemed the bridge over the Colorado River at Moab important enough to place it under guard as late as World War II.

In 1943, a former Civilian Conservation Corps camp outside Moab was used as a Citizen Isolation Center to confine Japanese American internees labeled "troublemakers" by authorities in the War Relocation Authority, the government body responsible for overseeing the wartime incarceration program. The Moab Isolation Center for "noncompliant" Japanese Americans was created in response to growing resistance to WRA policies within the camps; a December 1942 clash between guards and inmates known as the "Manzanar Riot", in which two were killed and ten injured, was the final push. On January 11, 1943, the sixteen men who had initiated the two-day protests were transferred to Moab from the town jails where they were booked (without charges or access to hearings) after the riot. Having closed just fifteen months prior, all 18 military-style structures of the CCC camp were in good condition, and the site was converted to its new use with minimal renovation. 150 military police guarded the camp, and director Raymond Best and head of security Francis Frederick presided over administration. On February 18, thirteen transfers from Gila River, Arizona, were brought to Moab, and six days later, ten more arrived from Manzanar. An additional fifteen Tule Lake inmates were transferred on April 2. Most of these new arrivals were removed from the general camp population because of their resistance to the WRA's attempts to determine the loyalty of incarcerated Japanese Americans, met largely with confusion and anger because of a lack of explanation as to how and why internees would be assessed. The Moab Isolation Center remained open until April 27, when most of its inmates were bused to the larger and more secure Leupp Isolation Center. (Five men, serving sentences in the Grand County Jail after protesting conditions in Moab, were transported to Leupp in a five-by-six-foot box on the back of a truck. Their separate transfer was arranged by Francis Frederick, who had also handed down their prison sentences, using a law he later rescinded to charge them with unlawful assembly.) In 1994, the "Dalton Wells CCC Camp/Moab Relocation Center" was added to the National Register of Historic Places, and, although no marker exists on the site, an information plaque at the current site entrance and a photograph on display at the Museum of Moab, formerly the Dan O'Laurie Museum, mention the former isolation center.

=== Later years ===
Moab's economy was originally based on agriculture, but gradually shifted to mining. Uranium and vanadium were discovered in the area in the 1910s and 1920s. Potash and manganese came next, and then oil and gas were discovered. In the 1950s Moab became the so-called "Uranium Capital of the World" after geologist Charles Steen found a rich deposit of uranium ore south of the city. This discovery coincided with the advent of the era of nuclear weapons and nuclear power in the United States, and Moab's boom years began.

The city population grew nearly 500% over the next few years, bringing the population to near 6,000 people. The explosion in population caused much construction of houses and schools. Charles Steen donated a great deal of money and land to create new houses and churches in Moab.

With the winding down of the Cold War, Moab's uranium boom was over, and the city's population drastically declined. By the early 1980s a number of homes stood empty, and nearly all of the uranium mines had closed.

In 1949, Western movie director John Ford was persuaded to use the area for the movie Wagon Master. Ford had been using the area in Monument Valley around Mexican Hat, Utah, south of Moab, since he filmed Stagecoach there 10 years earlier in 1939. A local Moab rancher (George White) found Ford and persuaded him to come take a look at Moab. The Moab to Monument Valley Film Commission is a Grand County Department housed with the Moab Office of Tourism and holds the title of the longest running film commission in the world. Established in 1949, the commission has overseen the production of the many movies filmed near Moab.

In recent years, Moab has experienced a surge of second-home owners. The relatively mild winters and enjoyable summers have attracted many people to build such homes throughout the area. In a situation mirroring that of other resort towns in the American West, controversy has arisen over these new residents and their houses, which in many cases remain unoccupied for most of the year. Many Moab citizens are concerned that the town is seeing changes similar to those experienced in Vail and Aspen in neighboring Colorado: skyrocketing property values, a rising cost of living, and corresponding effects on local low- and middle-income workers.

== Geography ==
Moab is just south of the Colorado River, at an elevation of 4,025 feet (1,227 m) on the Colorado Plateau. It is 18 miles (29 km) west of the Utah/Colorado state line. Via U.S. Route 191, it is 31 miles (50 km) south of Interstate 70 at Crescent Junction, and it is 54 miles (87 km) north of Monticello. Via Utah State Route 128 it is 46 miles (74 km) southwest of Cisco. The entrance to Arches National Park is 4 miles (6 km) north of Moab on US 191. Hurrah Pass is located on the trail between Moab and Chicken Corners. Kokopelli's Trail, a 142-mile mountain biking trail which begins near Loma, Colorado, ends in Moab.

According to the United States Census Bureau, the city has a total area of 12 square kilometres (4.8 sq mi), all land.

=== Climate ===
Moab has a semi-arid climate bordering on arid (Köppen BSk) characterized by hot summers and chilly winters, with precipitation evenly spread over the year (usually less than one inch per month). There are an average of 41 days with temperatures reaching 100 °F (38 °C), 109 days reaching 90 °F (32 °C), and 3.6 days per winter where the temperature remains at or below freezing. The highest temperature was 114 °F (46 °C) on July 7, 1989. The lowest temperature was −24 °F (−31 °C) on January 22, 1930.

Average annual precipitation in Moab is 9.02 inches (229 mm). There are an average of 55 days annually with measurable precipitation. The wettest year was 1983 with 16.42 inches (417 mm) and the driest year was 1898 with 4.32 inches (110 mm). The most precipitation in one month was 6.63 inches (168 mm) in July 1918. The most precipitation in 24 hours was 2.77 in (70 mm) on July 23, 1983.

Average seasonal snowfall for 1981–2011 is 6.9 inches (18 cm). The most snow in a season was 74 in (190 cm) during 1914–15, and the snowiest month on average is December, with the record set in 1915 at 46.0 in (117 cm).

Climate data for Moab, Utah, 1991–2020 normals, extremes 1893–present
| Month | Jan | Feb | Mar | Apr | May | Jun | Jul | Aug | Sep | Oct | Nov | Dec | Year |
|---|---|---|---|---|---|---|---|---|---|---|---|---|---|
| Record high °F (°C) | 67 (19) | 78 (26) | 88 (31) | 96 (36) | 109 (43) | 113 (45) | 114 (46) | 110 (43) | 108 (42) | 97 (36) | 82 (28) | 67 (19) | 114 (46) |
| Mean maximum °F (°C) | 57.2 (14.0) | 65.4 (18.6) | 78.2 (25.7) | 86.2 (30.1) | 95.8 (35.4) | 104.1 (40.1) | 106.9 (41.6) | 103.7 (39.8) | 98.7 (37.1) | 88.4 (31.3) | 71.7 (22.1) | 58.1 (14.5) | 107.4 (41.9) |
| Mean daily maximum °F (°C) | 43.5 (6.4) | 52.1 (11.2) | 64.6 (18.1) | 72.4 (22.4) | 82.6 (28.1) | 93.9 (34.4) | 99.2 (37.3) | 95.9 (35.5) | 87.7 (30.9) | 73.5 (23.1) | 57.1 (13.9) | 43.9 (6.6) | 72.2 (22.3) |
| Daily mean °F (°C) | 32.4 (0.2) | 39.6 (4.2) | 50.1 (10.1) | 57.4 (14.1) | 66.7 (19.3) | 76.4 (24.7) | 82.7 (28.2) | 80.0 (26.7) | 71.2 (21.8) | 57.6 (14.2) | 43.7 (6.5) | 33.0 (0.6) | 57.6 (14.2) |
| Mean daily minimum °F (°C) | 21.4 (−5.9) | 27.2 (−2.7) | 35.6 (2.0) | 42.6 (5.9) | 50.7 (10.4) | 58.9 (14.9) | 66.3 (19.1) | 64.1 (17.8) | 54.7 (12.6) | 41.7 (5.4) | 30.3 (−0.9) | 22.0 (−5.6) | 43.0 (6.1) |
| Mean minimum °F (°C) | 10.0 (−12.2) | 15.6 (−9.1) | 23.1 (−4.9) | 29.9 (−1.2) | 38.1 (3.4) | 47.6 (8.7) | 56.4 (13.6) | 54.9 (12.7) | 41.5 (5.3) | 28.0 (−2.2) | 17.4 (−8.1) | 9.3 (−12.6) | 6.8 (−14.0) |
| Record low °F (°C) | −24 (−31) | −13 (−25) | 8 (−13) | 15 (−9) | 27 (−3) | 36 (2) | 43 (6) | 40 (4) | 28 (−2) | 13 (−11) | 2 (−17) | −19 (−28) | −24 (−31) |
| Average precipitation inches (mm) | 0.65 (17) | 0.66 (17) | 0.70 (18) | 0.77 (20) | 0.82 (21) | 0.35 (8.9) | 0.92 (23) | 0.88 (22) | 0.89 (23) | 1.03 (26) | 0.70 (18) | 0.76 (19) | 9.13 (232.9) |
| Average snowfall inches (cm) | 1.7 (4.3) | 1.4 (3.6) | 0.2 (0.51) | 0.0 (0.0) | 0.0 (0.0) | 0.0 (0.0) | 0.0 (0.0) | 0.0 (0.0) | 0.0 (0.0) | 0.1 (0.25) | 1.0 (2.5) | 4.9 (12) | 9.3 (23.16) |
| Average precipitation days (≥ 0.01 in) | 5.4 | 6.2 | 5.5 | 5.4 | 4.8 | 2.5 | 4.7 | 6.4 | 5.4 | 5.4 | 4.4 | 5.5 | 61.6 |
| Average snowy days (≥ 0.1 in) | 1.2 | 0.7 | 0.2 | 0.0 | 0.0 | 0.0 | 0.0 | 0.0 | 0.0 | 0.1 | 0.4 | 2.1 | 4.7 |
Source 1: NOAA
Source 2: National Weather Service

== Demographics ==
Historical population
| Census | Pop. | Note | %± |
|---|---|---|---|
| 1890 | 333 | | — |
| 1900 | 376 | | 12.9% |
| 1910 | 586 | | 55.9% |
| 1920 | 856 | | 46.1% |
| 1930 | 863 | | 0.8% |
| 1940 | 1,084 | | 25.6% |
| 1950 | 1,274 | | 17.5% |
| 1960 | 4,682 | | 267.5% |
| 1970 | 4,793 | | 2.4% |
| 1980 | 5,333 | | 11.3% |
| 1990 | 3,971 | | −25.5% |
| 2000 | 4,779 | | 20.3% |
| 2010 | 5,046 | | 5.6% |
| 2020 | 5,366 | | 6.3% |
U.S. Decennial Census

=== Racial and ethnic composition ===
Racial composition as of the 2020 census
| Race | Number | Percent |
|---|---|---|
| White | 4,104 | 76.5% |
| Black or African American | 44 | 0.8% |
| American Indian and Alaska Native | 273 | 5.1% |
| Asian | 52 | 1.0% |
| Native Hawaiian and Other Pacific Islander | 2 | 0.0% |
| Some other race | 361 | 6.7% |
| Two or more races | 530 | 9.9% |
| Hispanic or Latino (of any race) | 894 | 16.7% |

=== 2020 census ===
As of the 2020 census, Moab had a population of 5,366. The median age was 37.6 years. 22.3% of residents were under the age of 18 and 15.9% of residents were 65 years of age or older. For every 100 females there were 98.2 males, and for every 100 females age 18 and over there were 96.5 males age 18 and over.

98.5% of residents lived in urban areas, while 1.5% lived in rural areas.

There were 2,235 households in Moab, of which 29.7% had children under the age of 18 living in them. Of all households, 36.1% were married-couple households, 24.0% were households with a male householder and no spouse or partner present, and 30.7% were households with a female householder and no spouse or partner present. About 33.2% of all households were made up of individuals and 14.0% had someone living alone who was 65 years of age or older.

There were 2,622 housing units, of which 14.8% were vacant. The homeowner vacancy rate was 1.2% and the rental vacancy rate was 6.9%.

=== 2000 census ===
As of the census of 2000, there were 4,779 people, 1,936 households, and 1,169 families residing in the city. The population density was 1,313.1 people per square mile (506.9/km^{2}). There were 2,148 housing units at an average density of 590.2 per square mile (227.8/km^{2}).

The racial makeup of the city was 90.35% White, 5.46% Native American, 0.36% African American, 0.29% Asian, 0.08% Pacific Islander, 1.88% from other races, and 1.57% from two or more races. Hispanic or Latino people of any race were 6.44% of the population.

There were 1,936 households, out of which 30.5% had children under the age of 18 living with them, 44.4% were married couples living together, 12.3% had a female householder with no husband present, and 39.6% were non-families. 31.3% of all households were made up of individuals, and 11.4% had someone living alone who was 65 years of age or older. The average household size was 2.43 and the average family size was 3.10.

In the city, the population was spread out, with 27.6% under the age of 18, 8.7% from 18 to 24, 28.5% from 25 to 44, 21.6% from 45 to 64, and 13.6% who were 65 years of age or older. The median age was 36 years. For every 100 females, there were 95.1 males. For every 100 females age 18 and over, there were 92.7 males.

The median income for a household in the city was $32,620, and the median income for a family was $38,214. Males had a median income of $35,291 versus $21,339 for females. The per capita income for the city was $16,228. About 12.0% of families and 15.7% of the population were below the poverty line, including 19.1% of those under age 18 and 10.5% of those age 65 or over.

== Arts and culture ==
Moab hosts several cultural events and festivals including the Moab Music Festival, LGBT Pride Festival, Folk Festival, Skinny Tire Festival, and others. The annual music festival occurs in September, and was founded in 1992 by several musicians from New York. The Moab Folk Festival features concerts by numerous folk musicians every November. Since 2011 Moab has hosted an LGBT Pride festival. The first festival included a "visibility" march which drew more than 350 people; in its second year's festival had over 600 in attendance. The Skinny Tire Festival is a road bike festival that occurs in March each year and raises funds for cancer research and survivors. Additionally, Moab sponsors the Moab Art Walk at multiple venues throughout the year, highlighting local artists' work.

== Education ==
The following public schools serve Moab area students:

- Helen M. Knight Elementary School, grades K-6
- Moab Charter School, grades K-6
- Margaret L. Hopkin Middle School, grades 7–8
- Grand County High School, grades 9–12

Moab is home to a regional campus of Utah State University.

== Media ==
Films shot in the Moab area include:

- Wagon Master (1950)
- Rio Grande (1950)
- Warlock (1958)
- Rio Conchos (1964)
- Fade In (1968)
- Nightmare at Noon (1988)
- Sundown: The Vampire in Retreat (1988)
- Indiana Jones and the Last Crusade (1989)
- Thelma and Louise (1990)
- Lightning Jack (1994)
- Riders of the Purple Sage (1996)
- RocketMan (1997)
- Mission Impossible II (1999)
- Godzilla x Kong: Supernova (2027)

== Infrastructure ==
=== Transportation ===
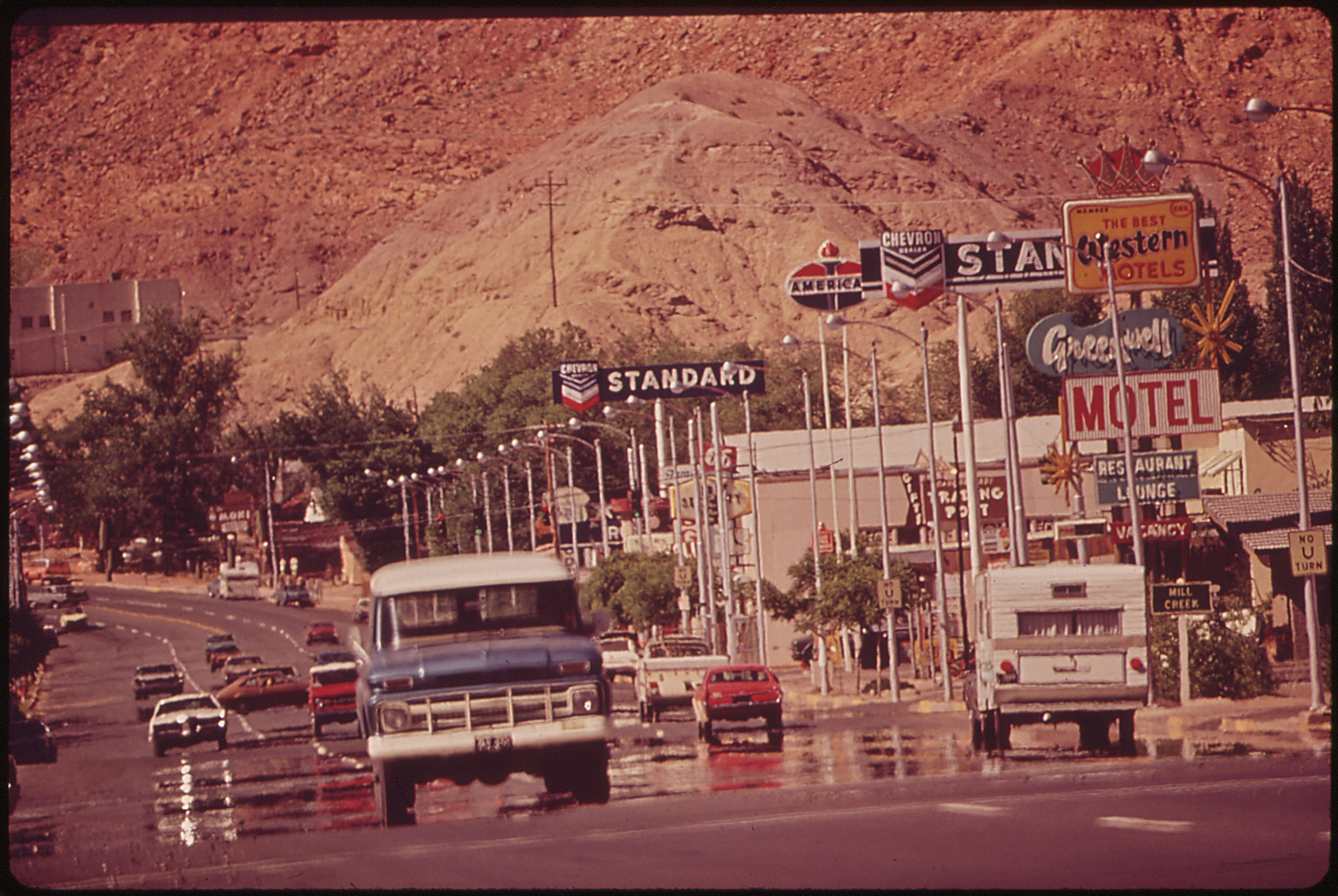
Moab Main Street in 1972

Prior to the construction of the railroad in 1883, Moab was a strategic place to cross the Colorado River. A toll ferry service across the river ended when a permanent bridge was built in 1911. This bridge was replaced with a new bridge in 1955, which was in turn replaced by another new bridge in 2010. The 1955 bridge was subsequently demolished. The highway that uses this bridge has been renumbered multiple times and is now numbered U.S. Route 191.

Moab gained freight railroad access in 1962, when a spur railroad line (now the Union Pacific Railroad's Cane Creek subdivision) was built to serve the Cane Creek potash mine. Moab has never had passenger rail service, although the California Zephyr has advertised service to Moab in the past via stops at Thompson Springs (no longer a scheduled stop), Green River or Grand Junction, Colorado. Beginning on August 15, 2021, the excursion company Rocky Mountaineer began operating passenger rail service between Moab and Denver, Colorado, in the form of the Rockies to the Red Rocks.

Bus service is provided by Salt Lake Express. There are a number of locally owned shuttle services that provide transportation to Salt Lake City and Grand Junction, CO.

Air service is available at Canyonlands Field.

== Notable people ==
- William Grandstaff, frontiersman.
- Jacques Boyer, cyclist
- Robert Fulghum, author
- Steven L. Peck, author and professor
- Suelo, simple living adherent
- Zane Taylor, former NFL football center for the New York Jets

== In popular culture ==
Books set partially in Moab include:

- Desert Solitaire (1968)
- The Scholar of Moab (2011)

== See also ==
- Edward Abbey
- American Discovery Trail, a coast-to-coast trail that passes through Moab
- The Lion's Back
- List of cities and towns in Utah
- Moab uranium mill tailings pile, the former Atlas mill site
- Upheaval Dome
- Utah monolith, located in the desert near the town
- Westwater Canyon
- Yellowcake boomtown
- The Times-Independent
