= Slickrock Trail =

Mountain biking trail outside Moab, Utah

Coordinates: 38°34′53″N 109°31′10″W

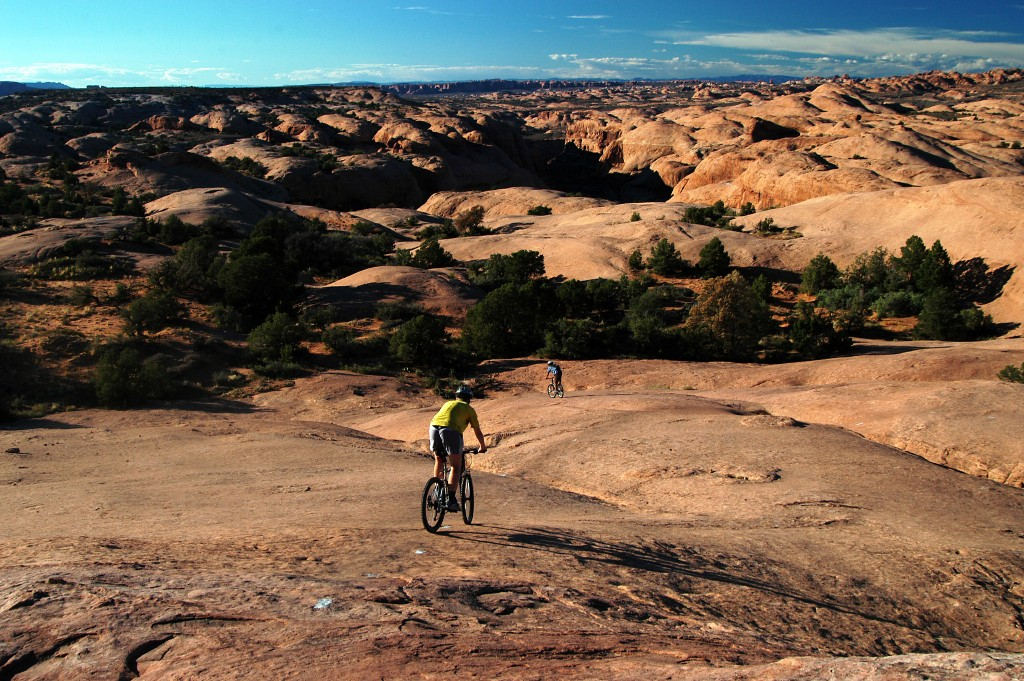
Mountain bikers on the Slickrock Trail, September 2004

The Slickrock Trail, is a popular mountain biking destination in Grand County, Utah, United States, a few miles northeast of the city of Moab.

This 10.5-mile (16.9 km) trail (Note: Actual length of the trail may vary as there are several alternate routes for the trail. In addition to the main trail, there is a shorter 2-mile (3.2 km) practice loop.) takes riders over a landscape of petrified sand dunes and the eroded remnants of ancient sea beds. Mountain bikers rate the Slickrock Trail as one of the more difficult rides in the Moab area, both technically and cardiovascularly.

== Description ==
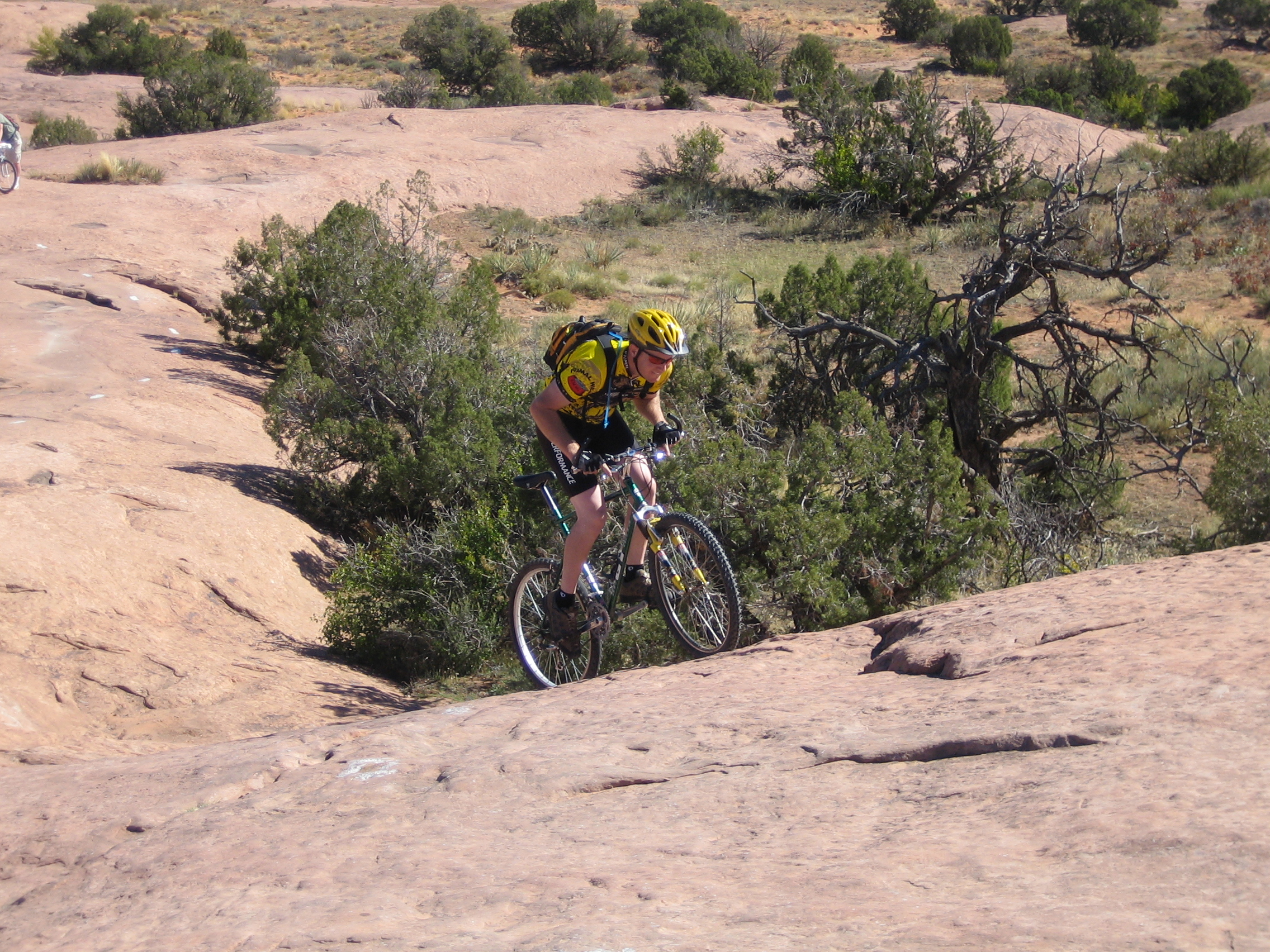
One of several steep hills on the Slickrock Trail, October 2005

Part of the Sand Flats Recreation Area (which is managed through a partnership between Grand County and the Bureau of Land Management), (Note: As of October 2017, the fees to access the Sand Flats Recreation Area are $5.00 per day or $10.00 per week for vehicles and $2.00 per day or $5.00 per week for others (including bicycle, motorcycle, shuttle bus, etc.). While annual passes are also available, federal and state recreation passes are not accepted. Additional fees also apply for camping and vehicle trailers.) the Slickrock Trail was originally laid out in 1969 by Richard R. Wilson for use by Honda Trail 90s (before the mountain bike was invented), and the area is still open to such recreation today. 4X4 and off-road enthusiasts will find a challenge on the nearby Hell's Revenge 4X4 Trail, which intersects the Slickrock Trail in several places.

The so-called "slickrock" sandstone, which forms the majority of the trail's surface has a surface much like sandpaper, making it really grippable by the rubber tires of a mountain bike or off-road motorcycle. The texture is notorious for inflicting severe abrasion injuries.

The name "slickrock" was used by early settlers of the area to describe the sandstone because of the low traction between horses' metal shoes and the rock's sloping surfaces. The same is true today for cyclists who use shoes with metal cleats while riding the Slickrock Trail. Slickrock also becomes slick when wet.

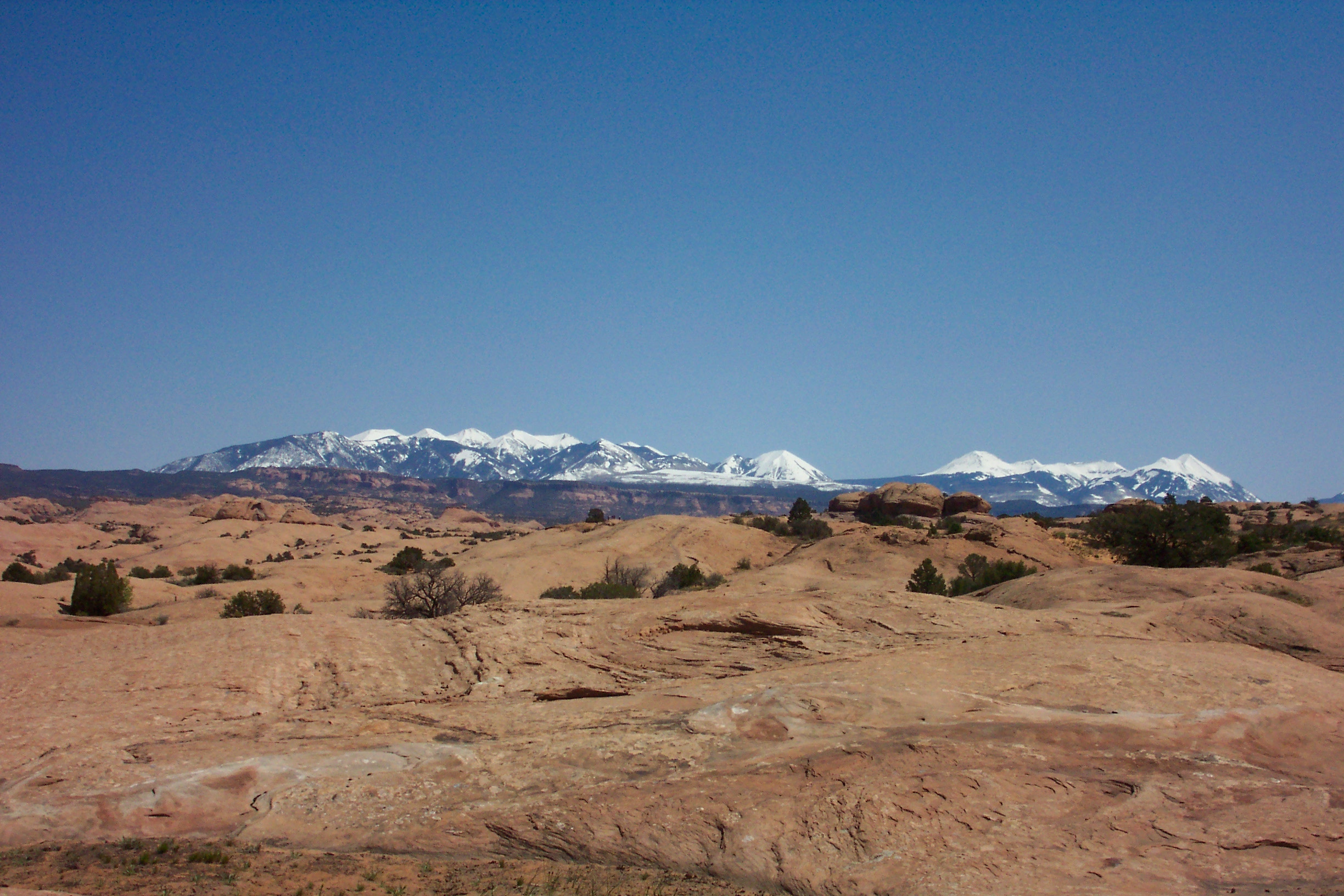
The La Sal Mountain Range as seen from Slickrock Trail, April 2005

In geological terms, the Slickrock Trail is not part of the Entrada Sandstone formation, which includes the Slick Rock Member. Rather, most of the outcrop that forms the trail is Navajo Sandstone, and the term "slickrock" has come to mean any expanse of sandstone with a surface level enough for walking or riding.

A small fee is required to enter the Sand Flats Recreation Area. Pit-toilets are available at the trailhead, but there is no drinking water available within the area.

Permitted trail activities include mountain biking, hiking, and motorcycling. All four-wheeled vehicles are prohibited on all of the Slickrock Trail, except those sections which intersect with the Hell's Revenge 4X4 Trail (which occurs about six times).

== Course ==
The Slickrock Trail consists of three main sections: An out-and-back lead-in (akin to the stick of a lollipop or stem of a cherry), the main 6.8-mile (10.9 km) loop (akin to the fruit of a cherry or the candy part of a lollipop), and an optional 2.3-mile (3.7 km) practice trail (also called the practice loop, although it is not literally a loop) that begins and ends at separate points on the lead-in.

The practice loop is about as hard as the rest of the trail, but it is shorter and close to the trailhead, serving for new riders as a sample of the rest of the trail or as an alternative return and or departure route.

The lead-in, main loop, and practice trail are marked out by white, dashed lines on the rock to prevent riders from straying from the trail, becoming lost, or disturbing the fragile cryptobiotic soil near which the trail passes. Trail maintainers also use yellow markings near blind drop-offs, narrow ledges, and other features to indicate to riders where to be particularly careful. (Note: The trail's first recorded fatality was in May 1975, when a motorcyclist went off a cliff near the trail, falling 600 feet (180 m) to his death. As the incident was observed by a person fishing below, it apparently occurred on a drop-off near SR-128 and the Colorado River.)

A panoramic view of the Slickrock Bike Trail
