= Adobe Mesa =

Mesa in Utah, United States

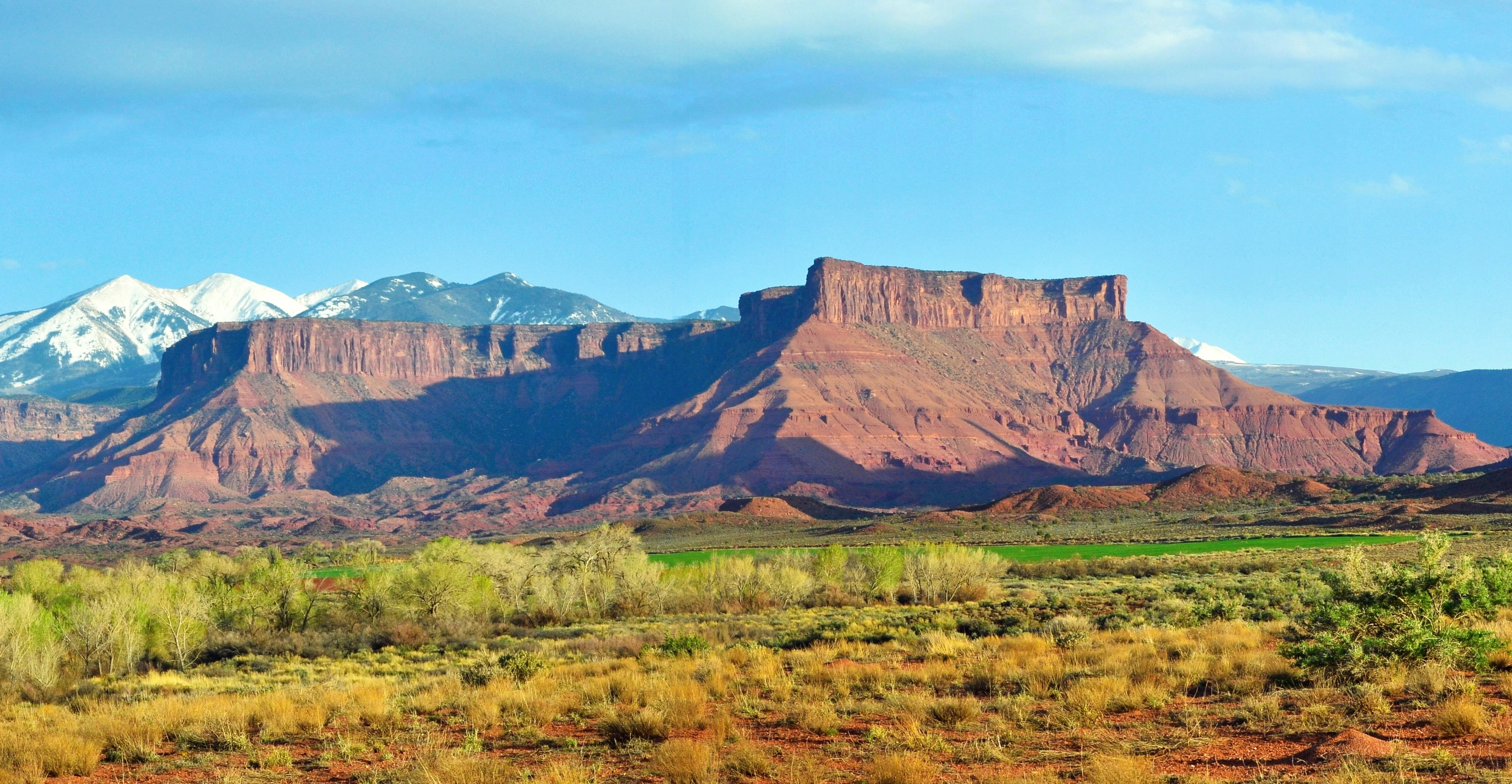
- North aspect

Highest point
- Elevation: 7,475 ft (2,278 m)
- Prominence: 375 ft (114 m)
- Parent peak: La Sal Peak
- Isolation: 4.98 mi (8.01 km)
- Coordinates: 38°36′37″N 109°18′16″W

Naming
- Etymology: Adobe

Geography
- Location within Utah Location within the United States
- Country: United States
- State: Utah
- County: Grand
- Parent range: Colorado Plateau
- Topo map: USGS Warner Lake

Geology
- Mountain type: Mesa
- Rock type: Sandstone

Climbing
- Easiest route: class 2 hiking

Adobe Mesa is a 7,475-foot-elevation (2,278-meter) summit in Grand County, Utah, United States.

== Description ==
Adobe Mesa is located four miles (6.4 km) east of Castle Valley, Utah, on land administered by the Bureau of Land Management. Adobe Mesa is five miles long northwest-to-southeast and two miles wide, with 400-foot vertical Wingate Sandstone walls. Topographic relief is significant as the summit rises nearly 2,300 feet (701 meters) above the surrounding terrain in 1.25 miles (2.01 km). Precipitation runoff from the mesa drains north into Professor Creek and south into Castle Creek which both empty into the Colorado River which is about six miles away. This landform's toponym has been officially adopted by the United States Board on Geographic Names.

== Geology ==
Adobe Mesa is composed of four principal strata of sandstone and siltstone. At the top is cliff-forming Wingate Sandstone which is the remnants of wind-born sand dunes deposited approximately 200 million years ago in the Early Jurassic. This overlays slope-forming Chinle Formation of Triassic age. Underlying Chinle is Moenkopi Formation which in turn overlays Permian Cutler Formation. There is an unconformity between the Cutler and the Moenkopi layers.

== Climate ==
Spring and fall are the most favorable seasons to visit Adobe Mesa. According to the Köppen climate classification system, it is located in a cold semi-arid climate zone with cold winters and hot summers. Summers highs rarely exceed 100 °F (38 °C). Summer nights are comfortably cool, and temperatures drop quickly after sunset. Winters are cold, but daytime highs are usually above freezing. Winter temperatures below 0 °F (−18 °C) are uncommon, though possible. This desert climate receives less than 10 inches (250 millimeters) of annual rainfall, and snowfall is generally light during the winter.

== See also ==
- Parriott Mesa

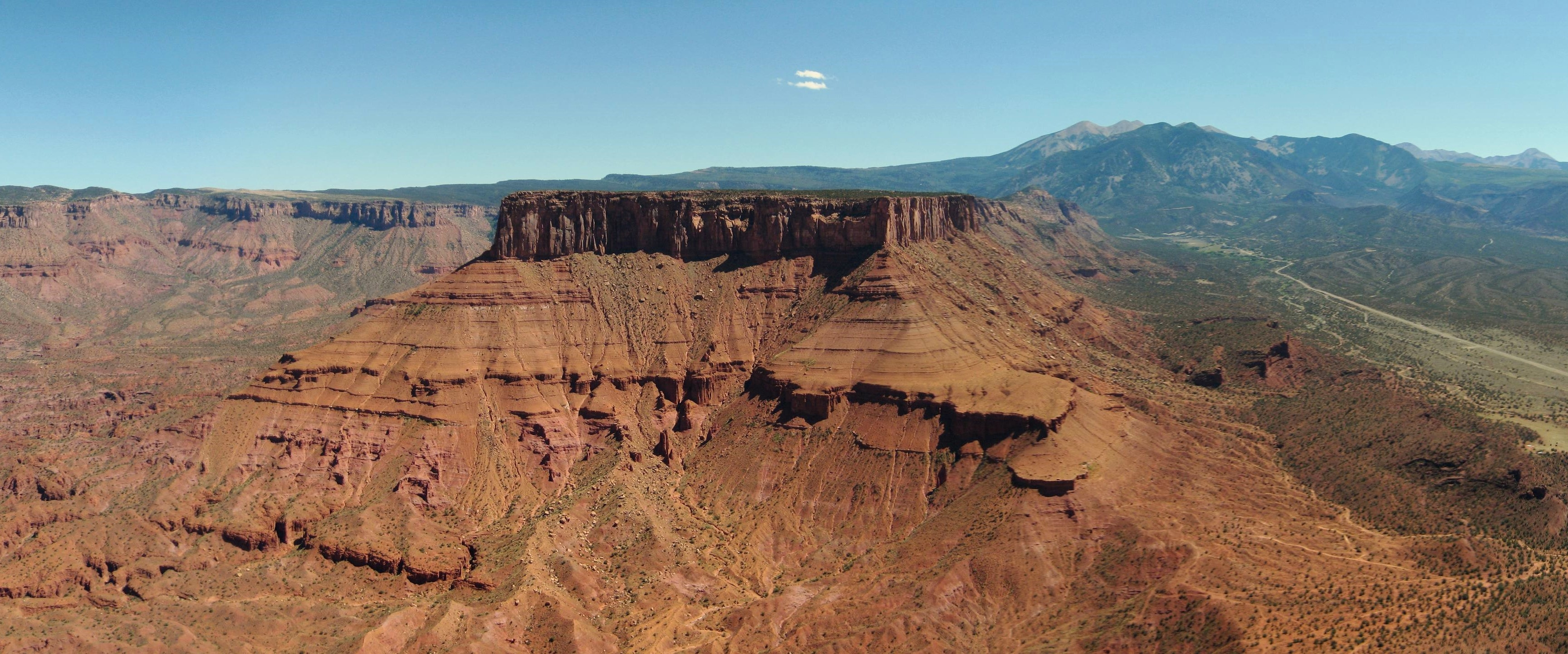
Northwest aspect of Adobe Mesa viewed from Castleton Tower
