= The Rectory (Utah) =

Sandstone summit in Utah, U.S.

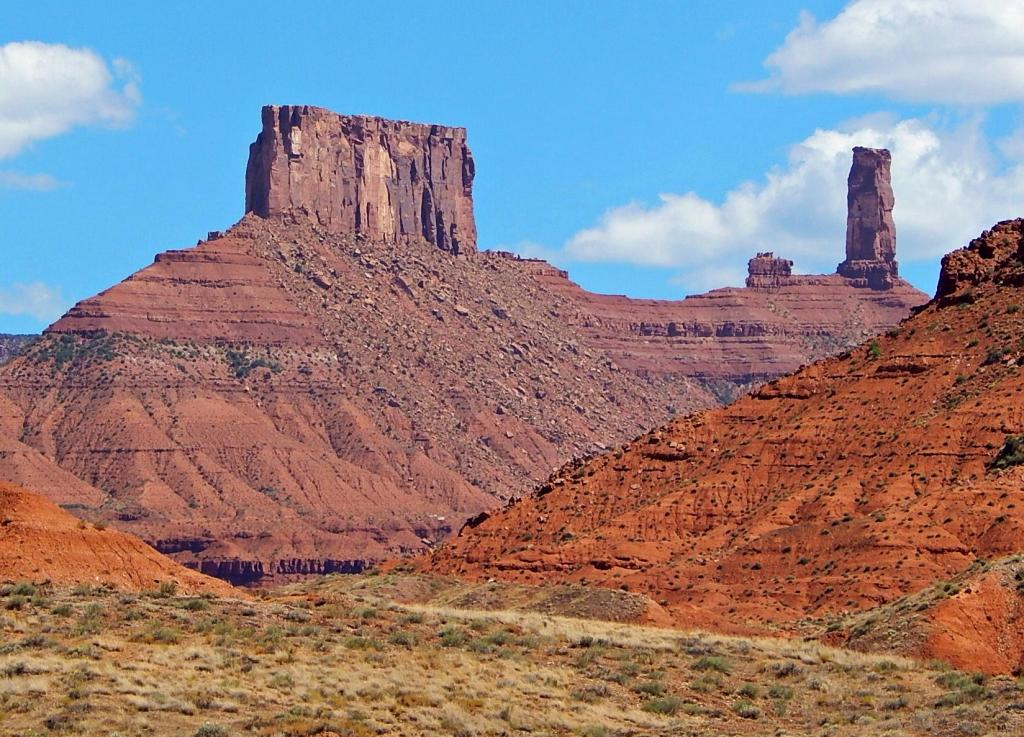
- The Rectory (left) and Castleton Tower (right) seen from Utah State Route 128

Highest point
- Elevation: 6,565 ft (2,001 m)
- Prominence: 405 ft (123 m)
- Coordinates: 38°39′22″N 109°22′02″W

Geography
- Location within Utah Location within the United States
- Country: United States
- State: Utah
- County: Grand
- Parent range: Colorado Plateau
- Topo map: USGS Fisher Towers

Geology
- Rock type: Wingate Sandstone

Climbing
- First ascent: 1962
- Easiest route: Climbing class 5.9

The Rectory is a 6,565 ft (2,001 m) sandstone summit in Grand County of Utah, United States. The Rectory is located at Castle Valley, Utah, near the city of Moab. The Rectory is a thin 200 feet (61 m) wide, and 1,000 feet (300 m) long north-to-south butte with 200 ft vertical Wingate Sandstone walls tower standing on a 1,000-foot Moenkopi-Chinle base. Precipitation runoff from The Rectory drains into the nearby Colorado River. The nearest higher peak is Castleton Tower, 0.35 miles (0.56 km) to the south. Priest and Nuns are towers immediately north and part of The Rectory. Further northwest along the connecting ridge is The Convent, with a rock tower called Sister Superior between the two. The first ascent was made May 22, 1962, by Harvey Carter and Cleve McCarty via Empirical Route. Harvey Carter named this geological feature.

== Climbing Routes ==
Classic Climbing Routes on The Rectory

- Fine Jade - class 5.11a - 5 pitches
- Ministry - class 5.11a - 5 pitches
- Coyote Calling - class 5.11+ - 4 pitches
- Crack Wars - class 5.11a/b - 4 pitches
- Find Shade - class 5.11 - 4 pitches
- Empirical Route - class 5.9R - 3 pitches

== Music Videos ==
The Jon Bon Jovi music video Blaze of Glory was filmed at The Rectory. The Australian band Heaven also filmed their Knockin' on Heaven's Door music video on top of The Rectory.

== Climate ==
Spring and fall are the most favorable seasons to visit, when highs average 60 to 80 °F (16 to 27 °C) and lows average 30 to 50 °F (−1 to 10 °C). Summer temperatures often exceed 100 °F (38 °C). Winters are cold, with highs averaging 30 to 50 °F (−1 to 10 °C), and lows averaging 0 to 20 °F (−18 to −7 °C). As part of a high desert region, it can experience wide daily temperature fluctuations. The area receives an average of less than 10 inches (250 mm) of rain annually.

== Gallery ==
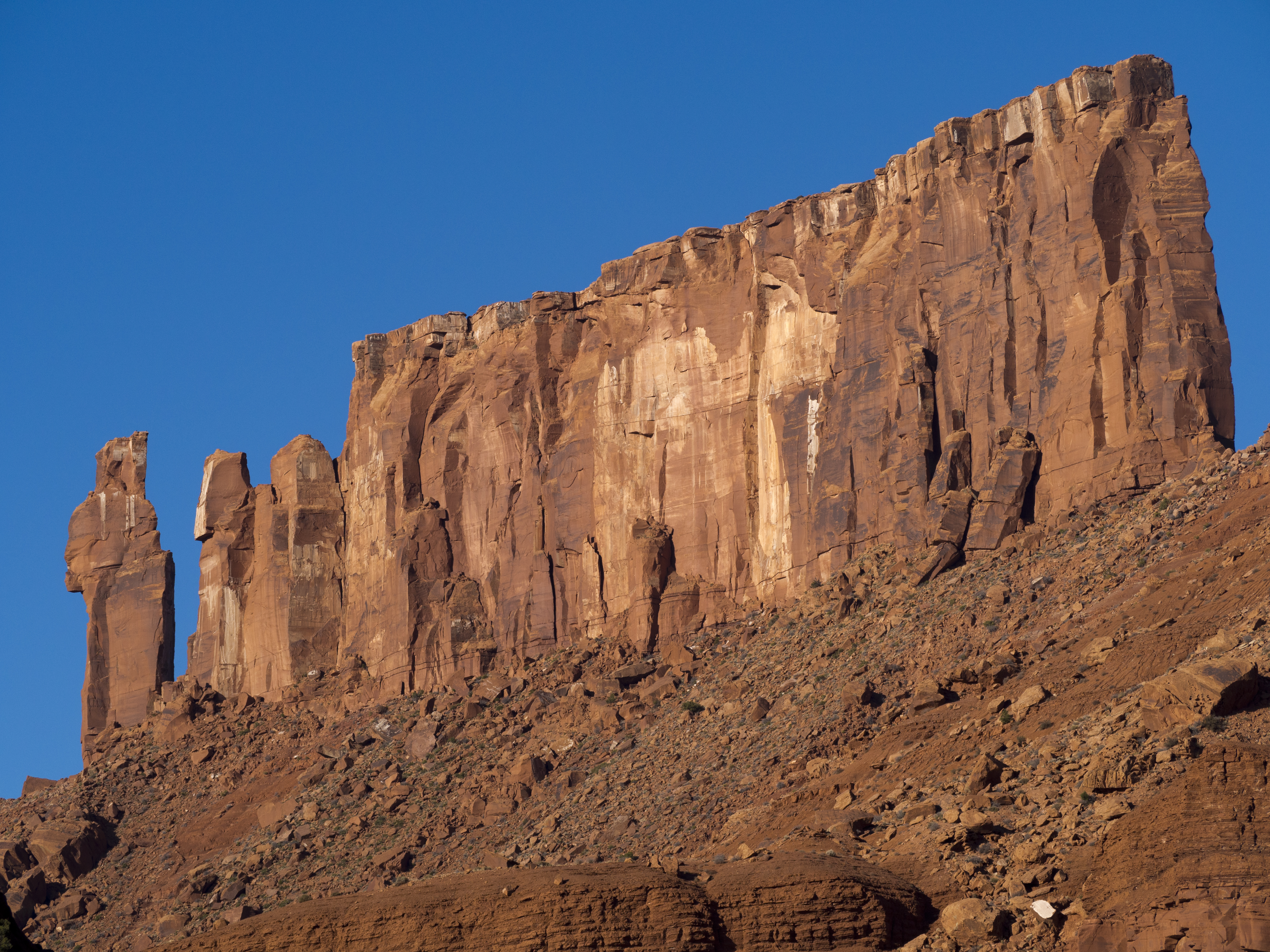
The Rectory, Priest and Nuns (left)

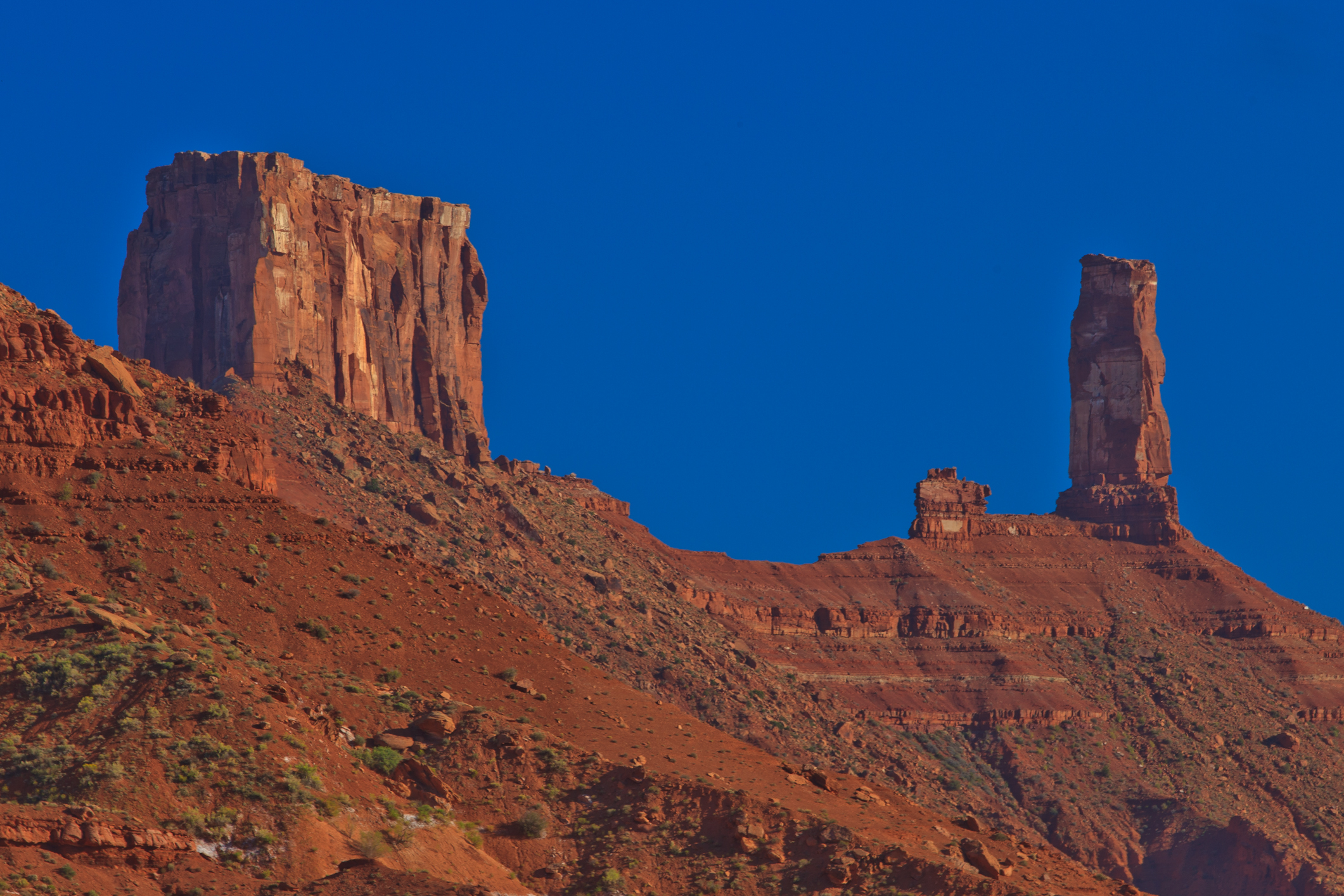
The Rectory (left) and Castleton Tower (right)

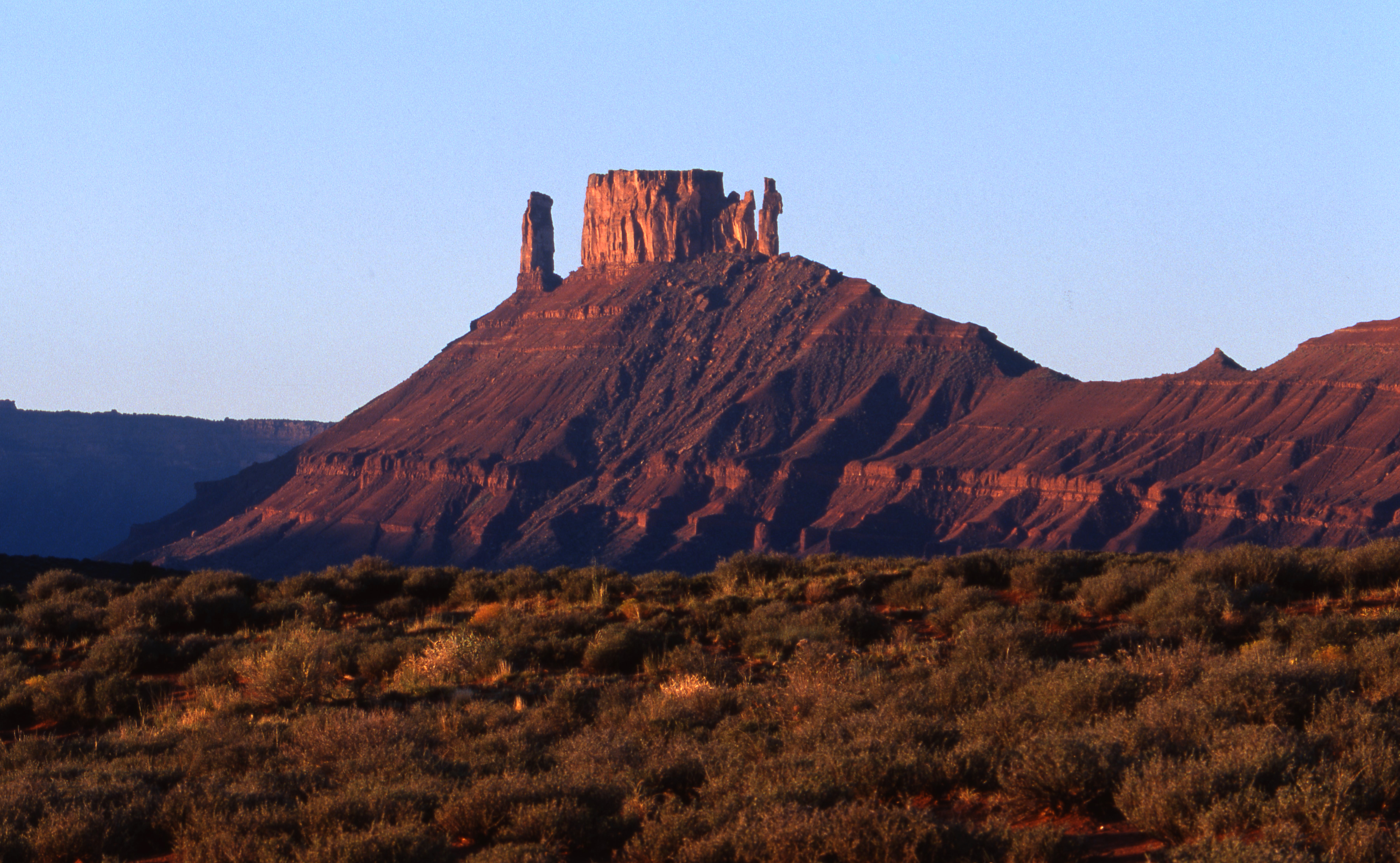
The Rectory seen from Fisher Towers
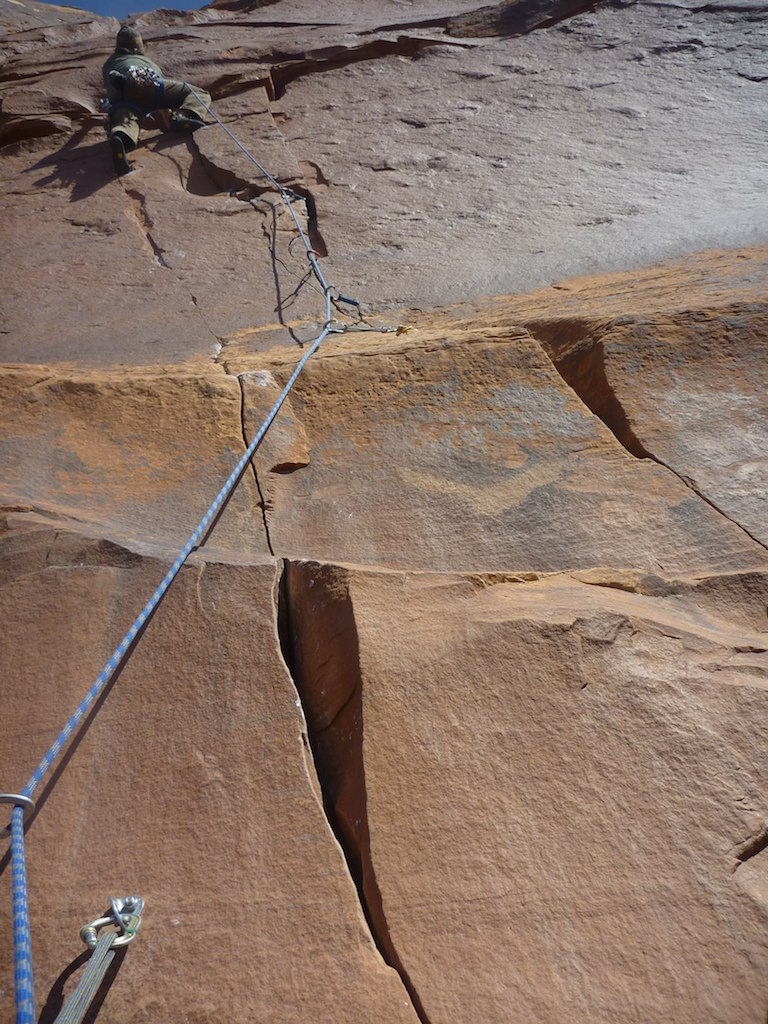
Crux Pitch of Fine Jade

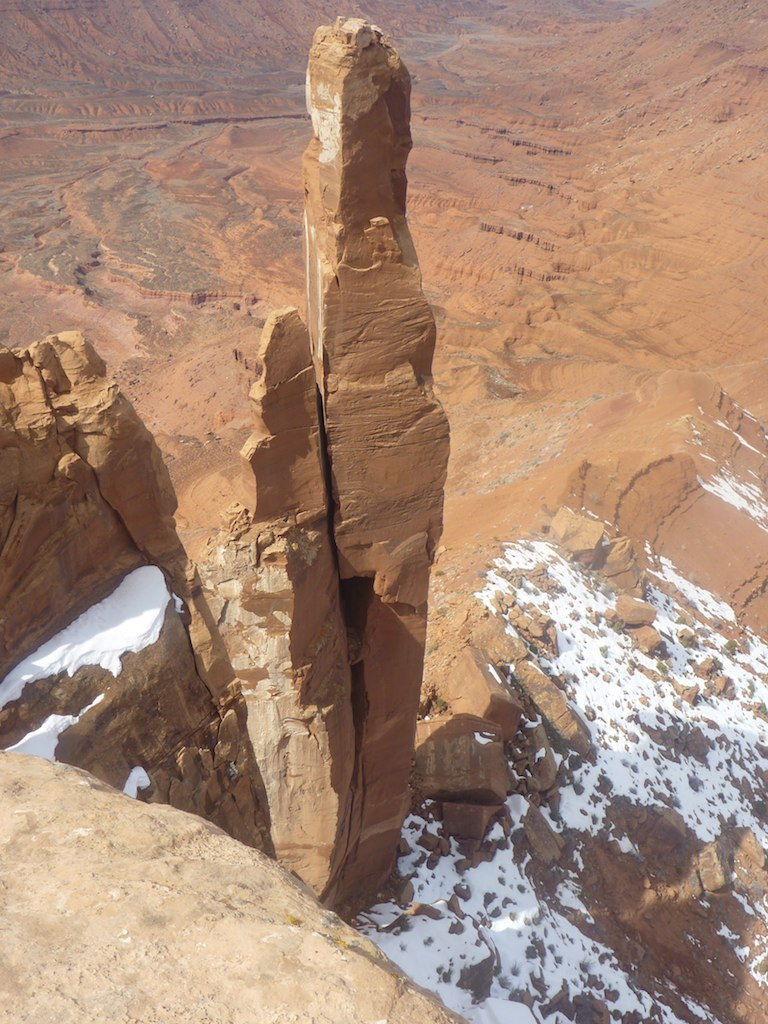
The Priest seen from The Rectory

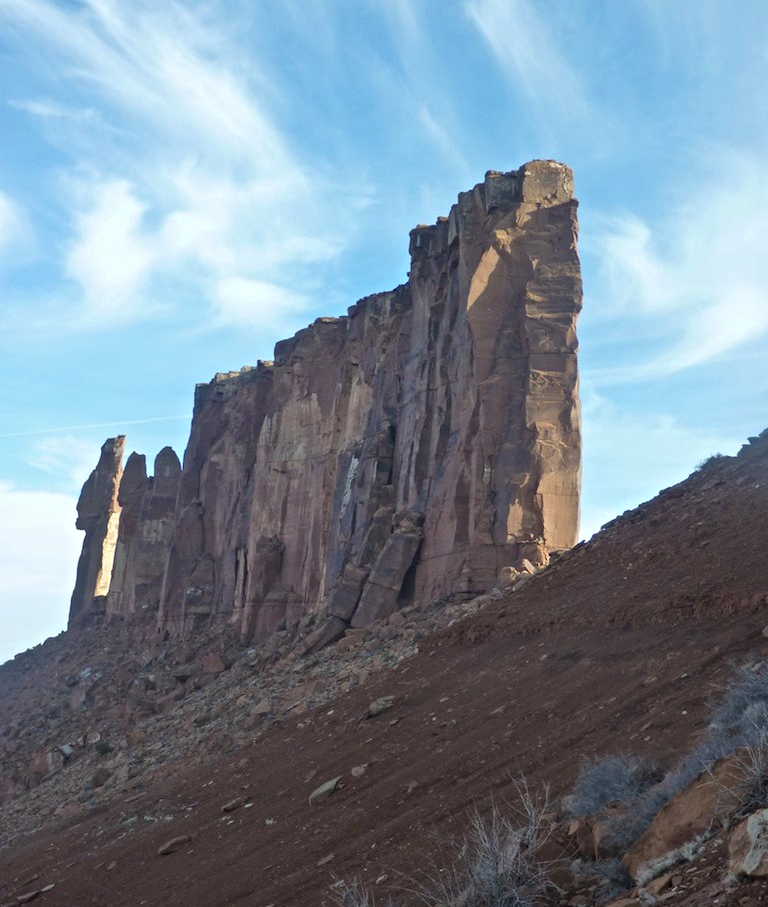
The Rectory, Priest and Nuns to left

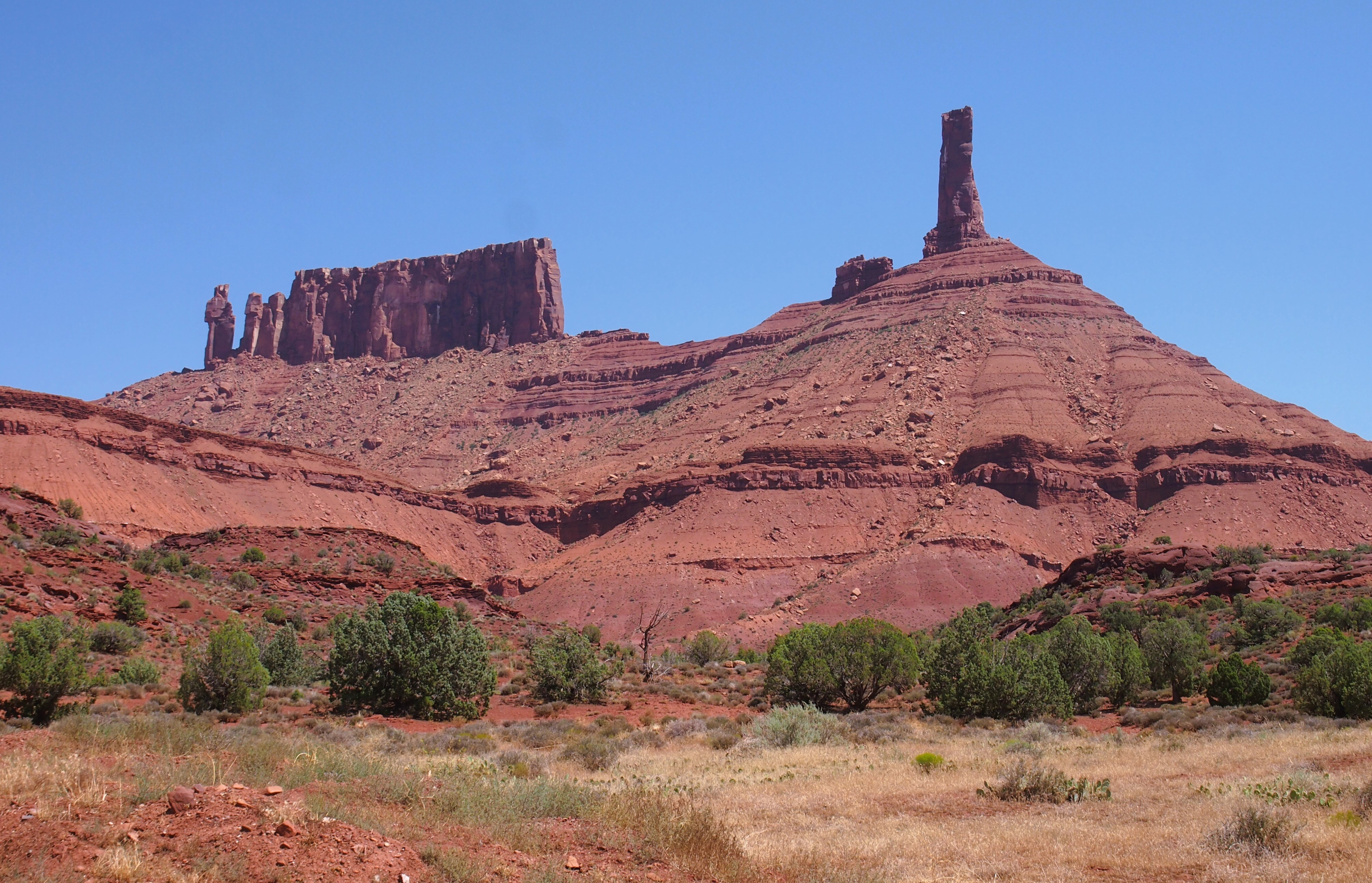
The Rectory (left) and Castleton Tower (right)

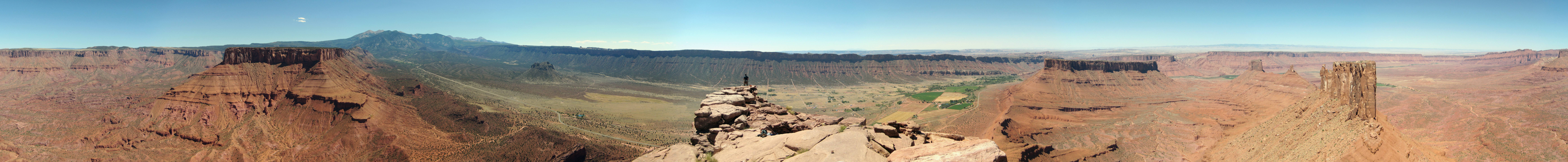
360° panorama from the top of Castleton Tower. Left to right: Adobe Mesa, Round Mountain, Castle Valley, Parriott Mesa, Convent (Mesa), Sister Superior, and The Rectory farthest to right. (Three clicks to enlarge)

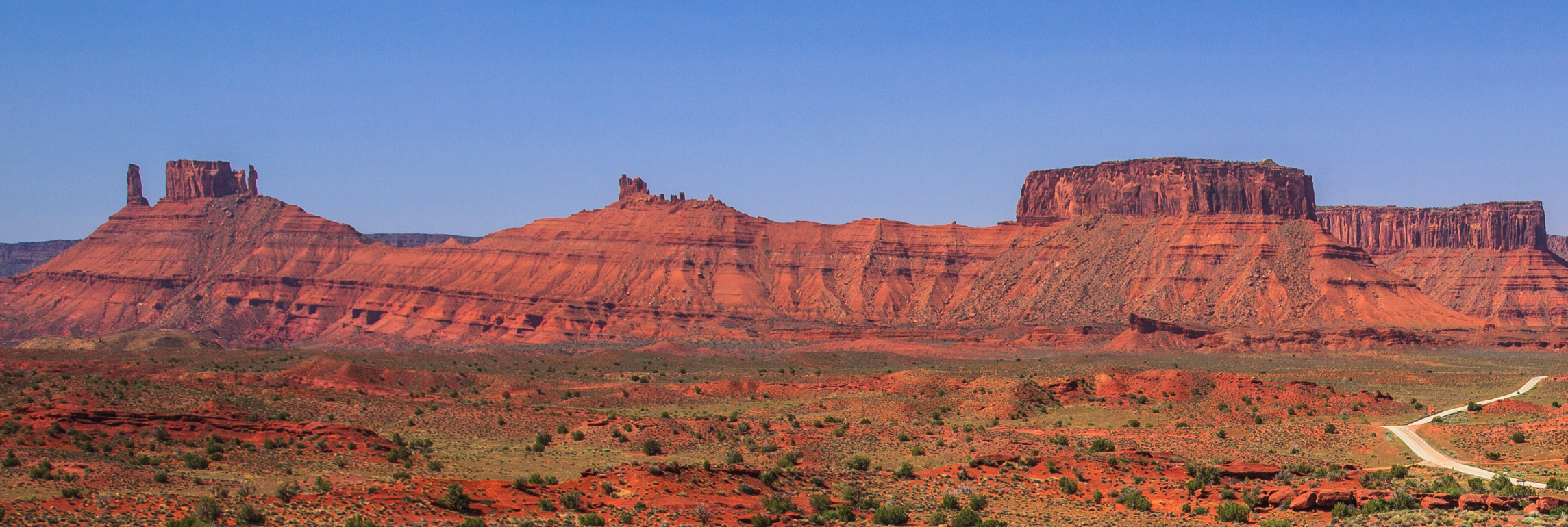
Left to right: Castleton Tower, The Rectory, Sister Superior, Convent Mesa, Parriott Mesa, Highway 128
