= Sister Superior (Utah) =

Sandstone summit in Utah, USA

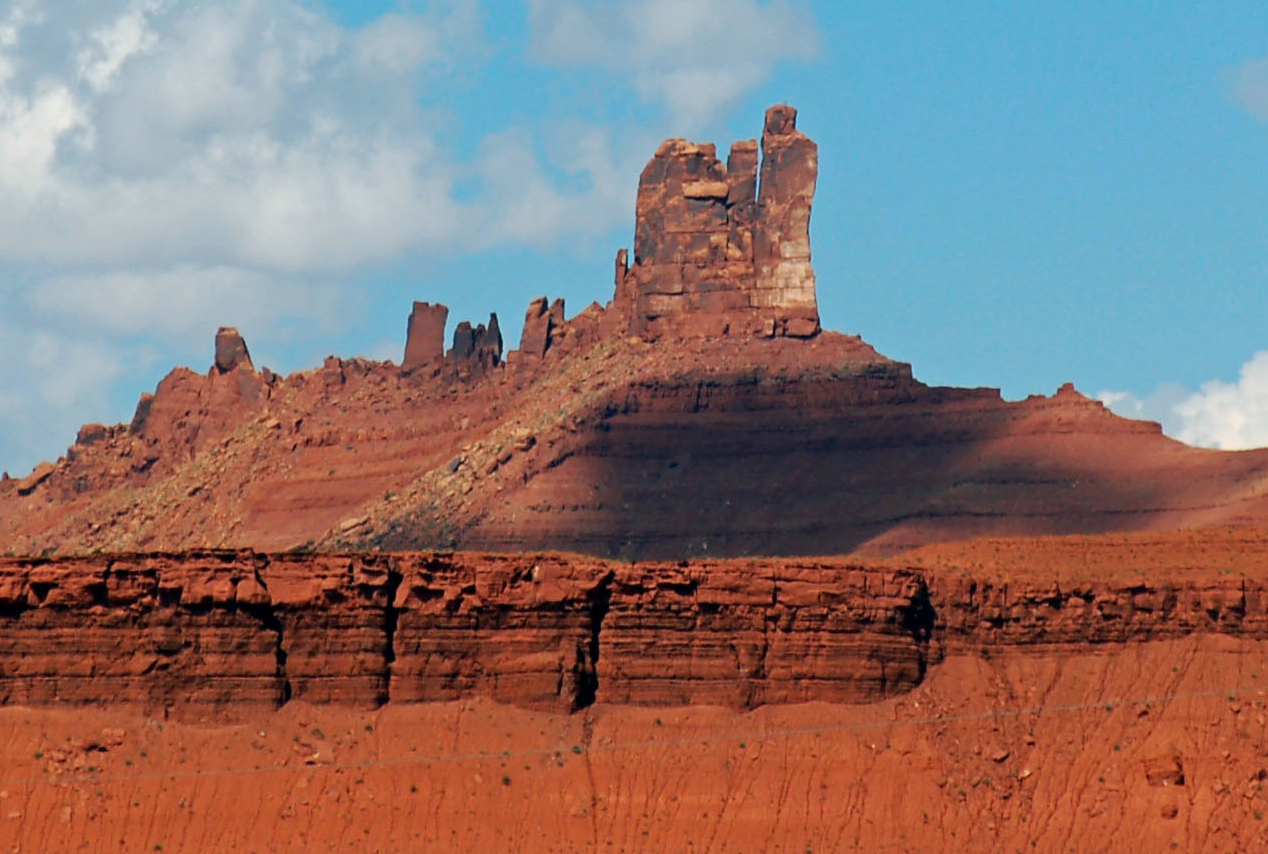
- Sister Superior

Highest point
- Elevation: 6,037 ft (1,840 m)
- Prominence: 497 ft (151 m)
- Parent peak: The Rectory
- Coordinates: 38°40′23″N 109°22′30″W

Geography
- Location within Utah Location within the United States
- Location: Grand County, Utah; United States
- Parent range: Colorado Plateau
- Topo map: USGS Fisher Towers

Geology
- Rock type: Wingate Sandstone

Climbing
- First ascent: 1965
- Easiest route: Climbing class 5.10

Sister Superior is a 6,037 ft elevation sandstone summit located southeast of The Convent in Grand County of Utah, United States. Sister Superior is located between Professor Valley and Castle Valley, near the city of Moab. It is situated east of Parriott Mesa and southwest of the Fisher Towers area. Remnants of an eroded butte, Sister Superior is a thin tower with 300+ ft vertical Wingate Sandstone walls standing on a 1,000 foot Moenkopi-Chinle base. The nearest higher peak is The Rectory (6,565 ft), 1.2 miles (1.9 km) to the south. Further south along the connecting ridge is Castleton Tower. Precipitation runoff from Sister Superior drains into the nearby Colorado River. The first ascent was made May 17, 1965, by Harvey Carter and David Bentley.

== Climbing Routes ==
Climbing Routes at Sister Superior

- Jah Man - class 5.10c - 5 pitches
- Black Sabbath - class 5.11 - 4 pitches
- Absolution - class 5.11 - 3 pitches
- The GAG Route - class 5.10d - 4 pitches

== Climate ==
Spring and fall are the most favorable seasons to visit, when highs average 60 to 80 °F and lows average 30 to 50 F. Summer temperatures often exceed 100 °F. Winters are cold, with highs averaging 30 to 50 °F, and lows averaging 0 to 20 °F. As part of a high desert region, it can experience wide daily temperature fluctuations. The area receives an average of less than 10 inches (25 cm) of rain annually.

== Gallery ==
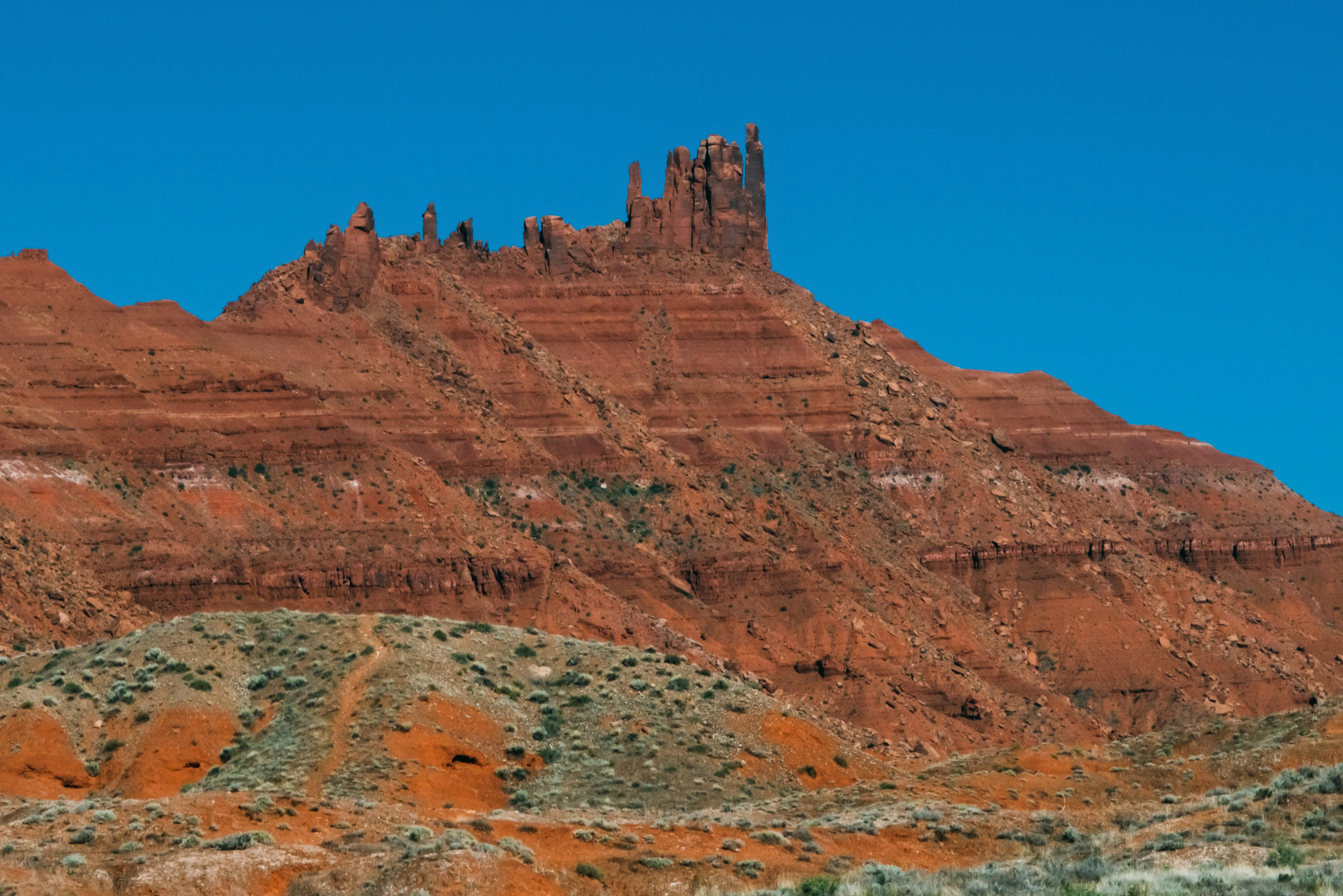

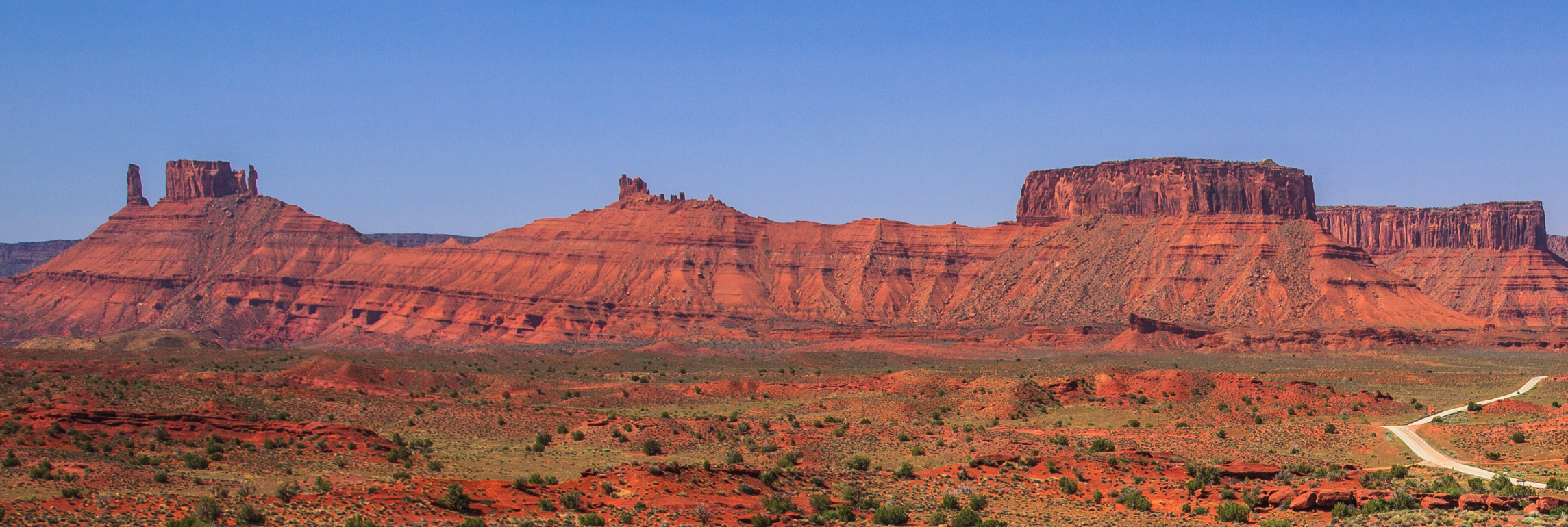
Left to right: Castleton Tower, The Rectory, Sister Superior, Convent Mesa, Parriott Mesa, Highway 128

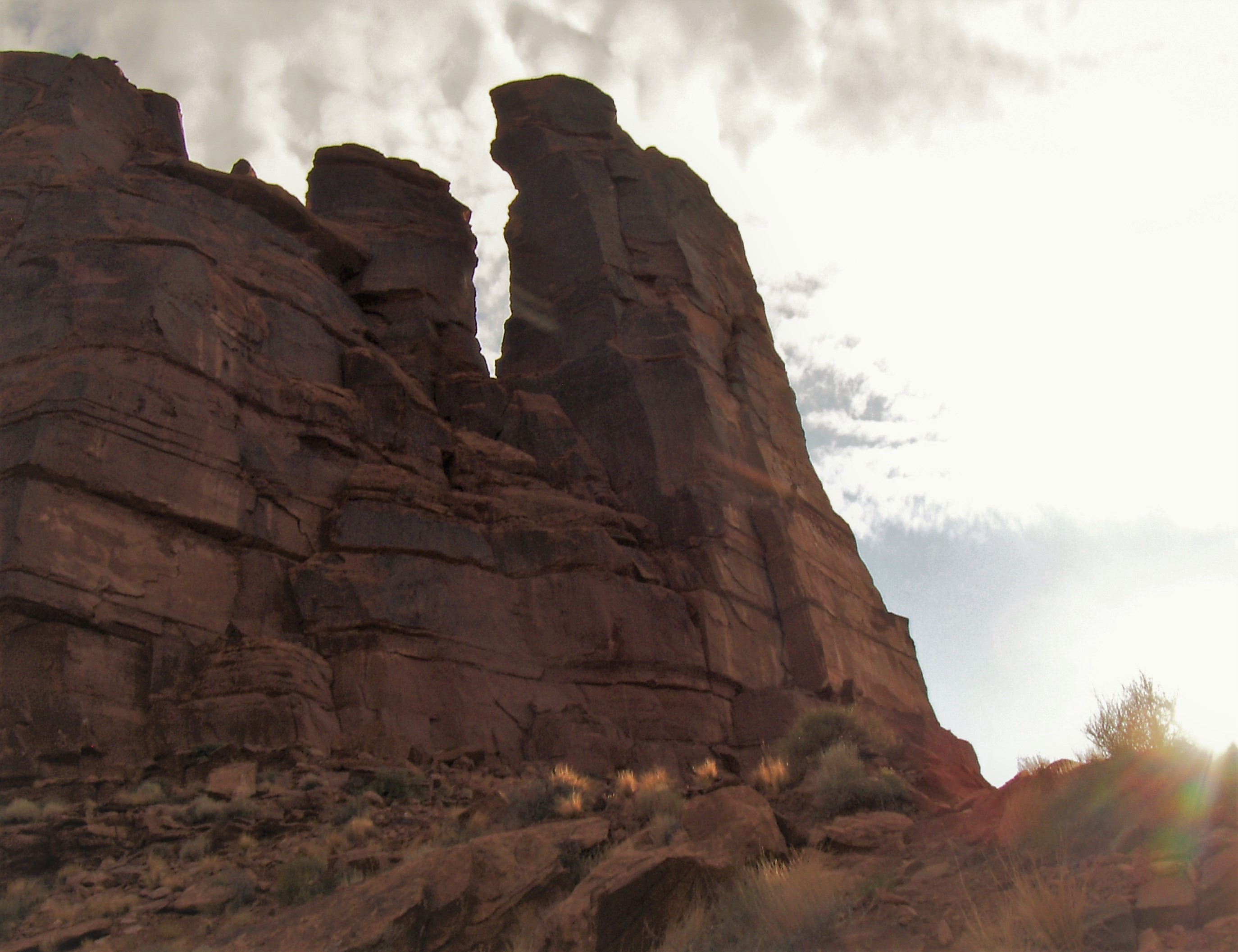
Sister Superior
