= Convent (Mesa) =

Sandstone summit in Utah, United States

The Convent
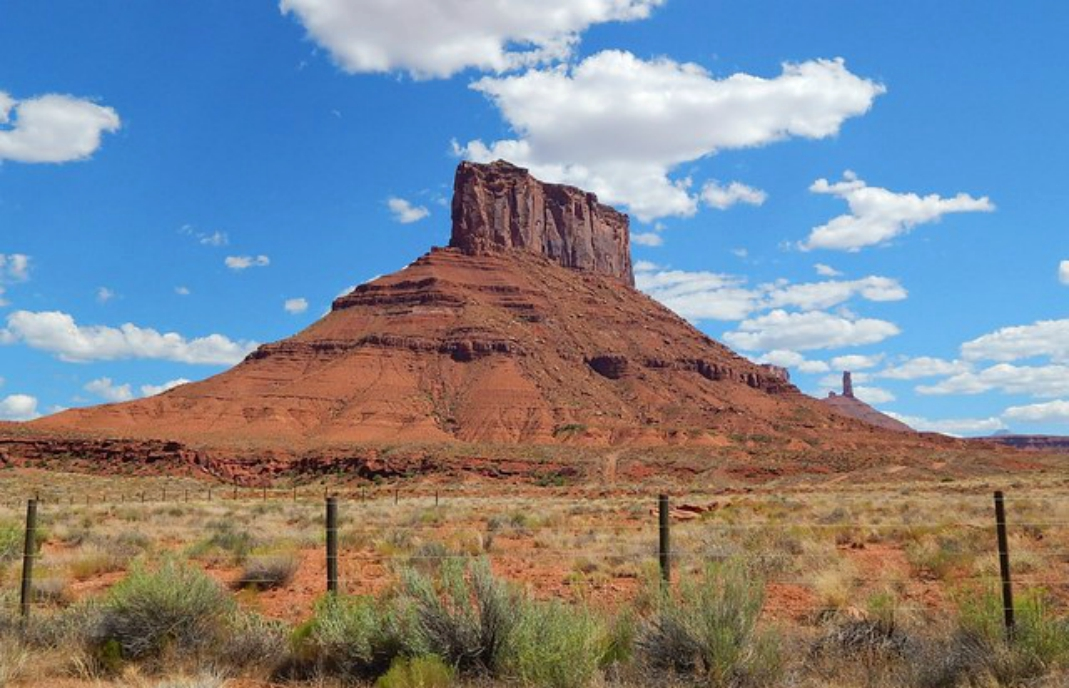
- The Convent seen from Utah State Route 128

Highest point
- Elevation: 5,955 ft (1,815 m)
- Prominence: 495 ft (151 m)
- Coordinates: 38°41′00″N 109°23′07″W

Geography
- Location within Utah Location within the United States
- Location: Grand County, Utah; United States
- Parent range: Colorado Plateau
- Topo map: USGS Big Bend

Geology
- Rock type: Wingate Sandstone

Climbing
- First ascent: 1965
- Easiest route: Climbing class 5.10

Convent Mesa, or The Convent, or simply Convent, are alternative names for a 5,955-foot elevation sandstone summit in Grand County of Utah, United States. The Convent is located in Professor Valley, near the city of Moab. It is situated northeast of Parriott Mesa and southwest of the Fisher Towers area. The Convent is a 1,000 feet wide, and 3,000 feet long northwest-to-southeast trending butte with 400-ft vertical Wingate Sandstone walls. The nearest higher peak is Sister Superior (6,037 ft), 0.91 miles (1.46 km) to the southeast. Further southeast along the connecting ridge are The Rectory and Castleton Tower. Precipitation runoff from The Convent drains into the nearby Colorado River. The first ascent of Convent was made in November 1965 by Harvey Carter and Steve Miller via the Salvation Chimney climbing route.

== Climbing Routes ==
Climbing Routes on The Convent

- Whore House - class 5.11- - 5 pitches
- The Value of Audacity - class 5.11+ - 5 pitches
- West Face Dihedral - class 5.10 - 6 pitches
- Choir Boyz - class 5.12- - 5 pitches
- Buddha's Delight - class 5.12 - 6 pitches
- The Middle Way - class 5.12 - 3 pitches
- Salvation Chimney - class 5.10

== Climate ==
Spring and fall are the most favorable seasons to visit, when highs average 60 to 80 °F and lows average 30 to 50 F. Summer temperatures often exceed 100 °F. Winters are cold, with highs averaging 30 to 50 °F, and lows averaging 0 to 20 °F. As part of a high desert region, it can experience wide daily temperature fluctuations. The area receives an average of less than 10 inches (25 cm) of rain annually.

== See also ==
- Castle Valley, Utah

== Gallery ==
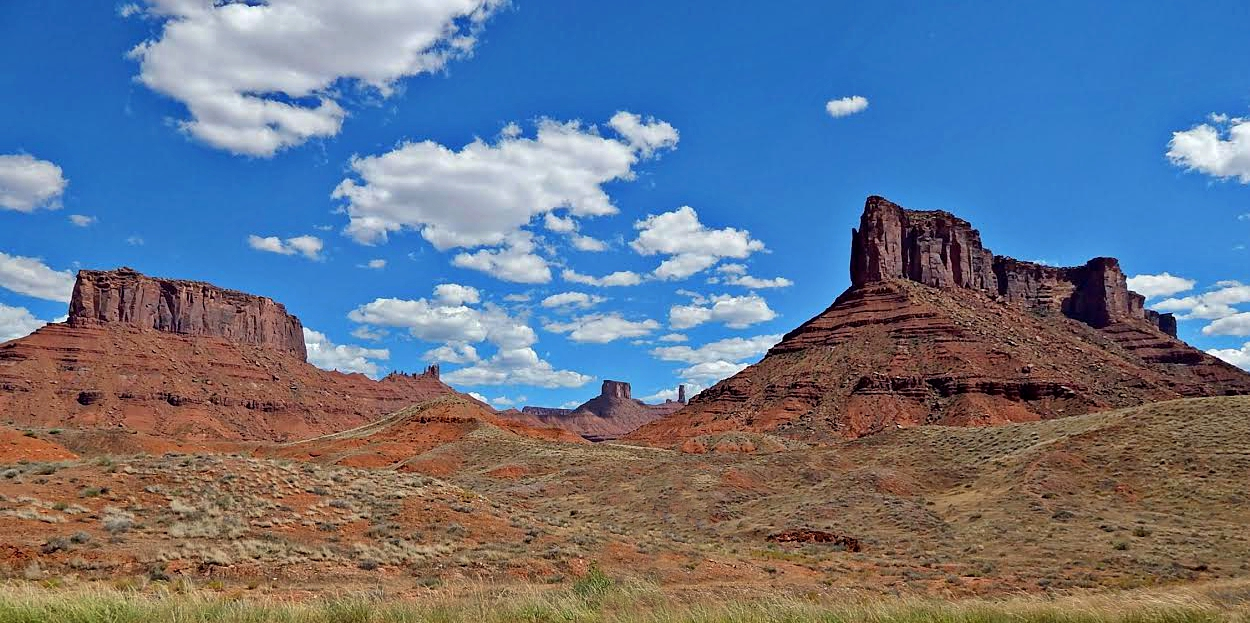
The Convent (left) and Parriott Mesa (right) seen from Utah State Route 128

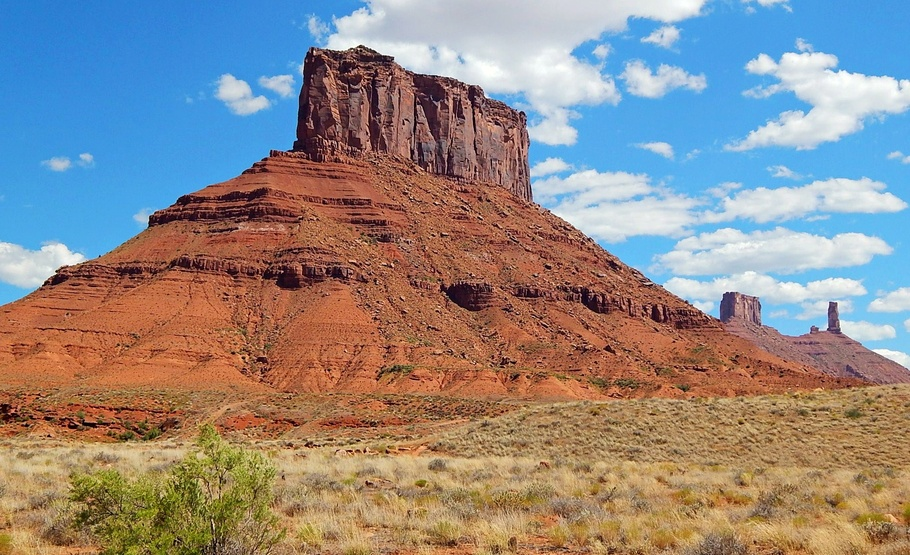
The Convent (with The Rectory and Castleton Tower to right)

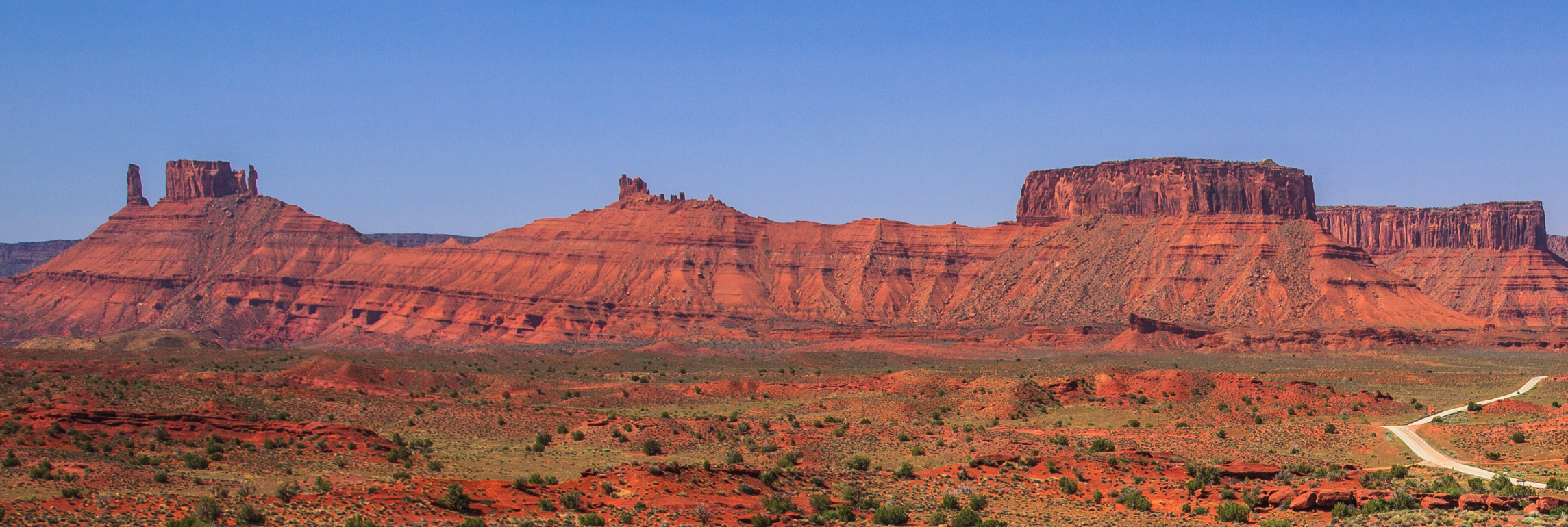
Left to right: Castleton Tower, The Rectory, Sister Superior, The Convent, Parriott Mesa

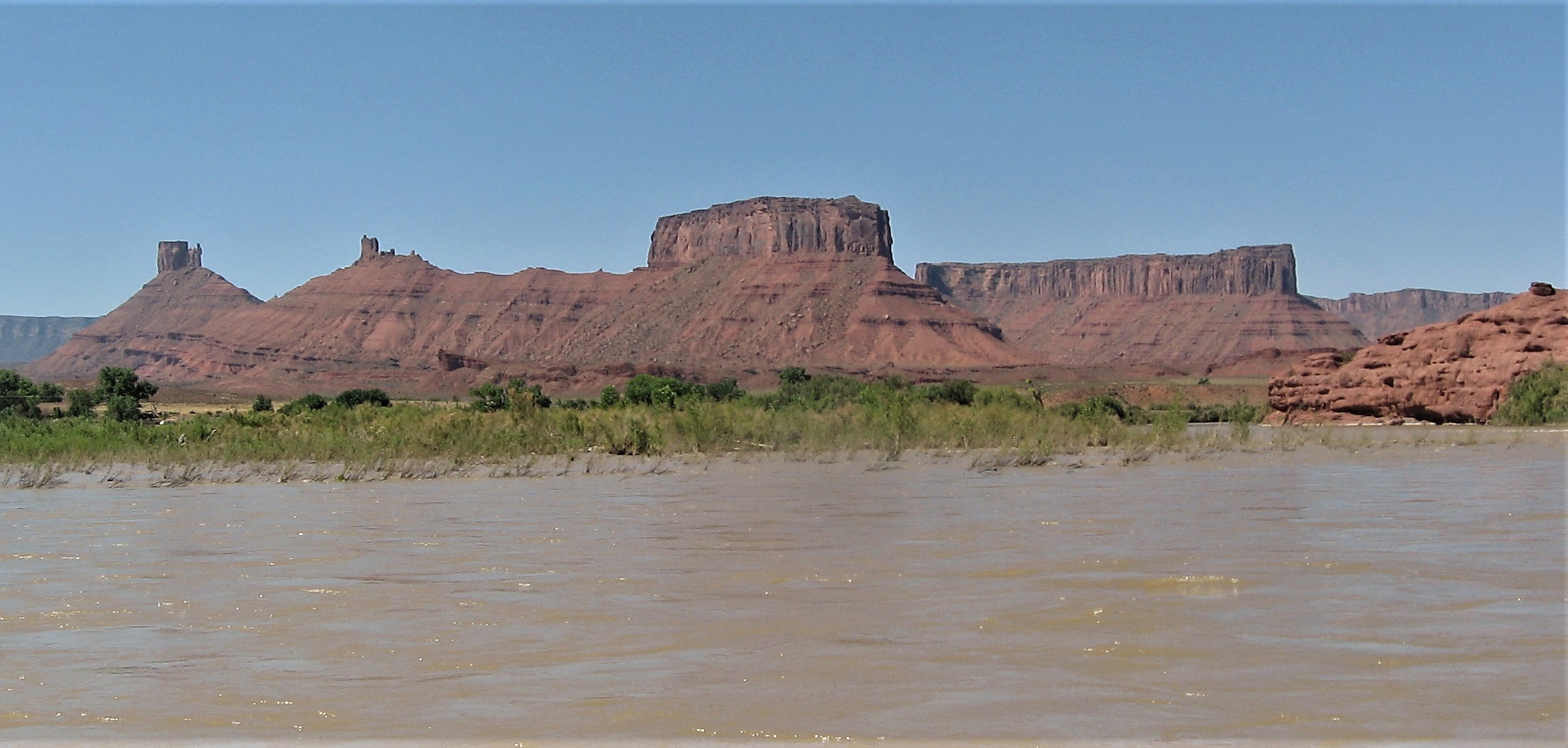
Convent Mesa from the Colorado River

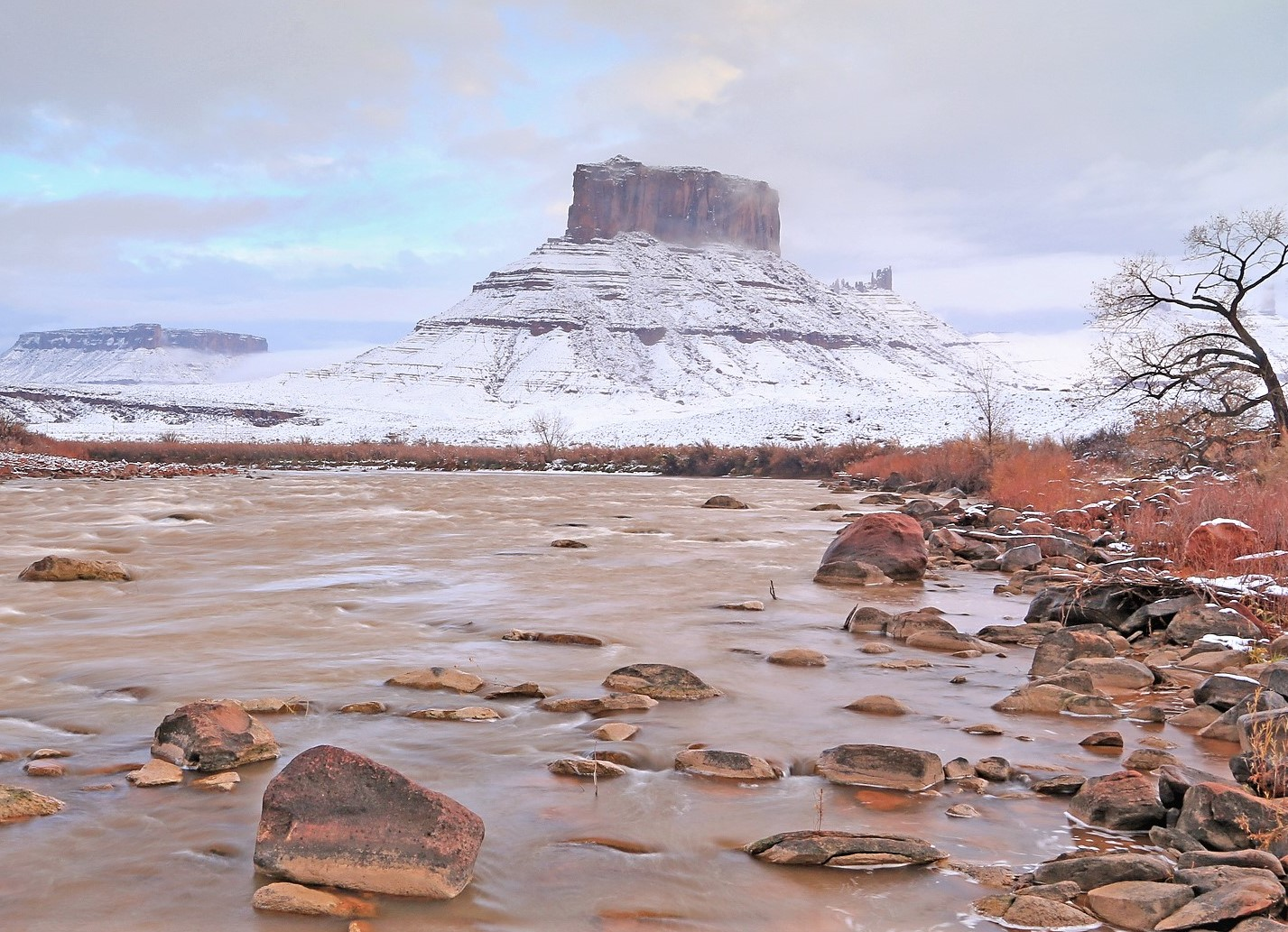
Convent in winter
