= Dewey, Utah =

- Ghost town
- Location within Utah Location within the United States
- Coordinates: 38°48′37″N 109°18′06″W
- Country: United States
- State: Utah
- County: Grand
- Founded: 1880s
- Abandoned: 1916
- Elevation: 4,140 ft (1,262 m)
- GNIS feature ID: 1437546

Dewey is a ghost town in along the Colorado River in southeastern Grand County, Utah, United States.

== Description ==
Originally named Kingsferry, it began in the 1880s when Samuel King built and operated a ferry across the Colorado River (but then known as the Grand River) at its confluence with the Dolores River. A small community soon developed around the ferry, although it never grew large. The town served as a ferry crossing until the Dewey Bridge was constructed in 1916.

== Climate ==
Climate data for Dewey, Utah (1991-2020 normals, 1967-2004 extremes)
| Month | Jan | Feb | Mar | Apr | May | Jun | Jul | Aug | Sep | Oct | Nov | Dec | Year |
|---|---|---|---|---|---|---|---|---|---|---|---|---|---|
| Record high °F (°C) | 64 (18) | 73 (23) | 84 (29) | 95 (35) | 105 (41) | 111 (44) | 114 (46) | 110 (43) | 107 (42) | 94 (34) | 80 (27) | 71 (22) | 114 (46) |
| Mean daily maximum °F (°C) | 42.2 (5.7) | 52.0 (11.1) | 64.5 (18.1) | 72.9 (22.7) | 83.1 (28.4) | 95.1 (35.1) | 100.9 (38.3) | 98.1 (36.7) | 89.7 (32.1) | 74.2 (23.4) | 57.4 (14.1) | 44.0 (6.7) | 72.8 (22.7) |
| Daily mean °F (°C) | 29.0 (−1.7) | 37.8 (3.2) | 47.6 (8.7) | 54.8 (12.7) | 64.3 (17.9) | 74.1 (23.4) | 80.4 (26.9) | 78.2 (25.7) | 68.9 (20.5) | 54.2 (12.3) | 40.7 (4.8) | 30.6 (−0.8) | 55.0 (12.8) |
| Mean daily minimum °F (°C) | 15.8 (−9.0) | 23.6 (−4.7) | 30.7 (−0.7) | 36.7 (2.6) | 45.4 (7.4) | 53.1 (11.7) | 59.9 (15.5) | 58.3 (14.6) | 48.2 (9.0) | 34.1 (1.2) | 23.9 (−4.5) | 17.3 (−8.2) | 37.3 (2.9) |
| Record low °F (°C) | −25 (−32) | −24 (−31) | 4 (−16) | 15 (−9) | 24 (−4) | 33 (1) | 42 (6) | 30 (−1) | 23 (−5) | 9 (−13) | −5 (−21) | −13 (−25) | −25 (−32) |
Source: NOAA

== See also ==
- List of ghost towns in Utah
