= Parriott Mesa =

Mesa in Utah, United States

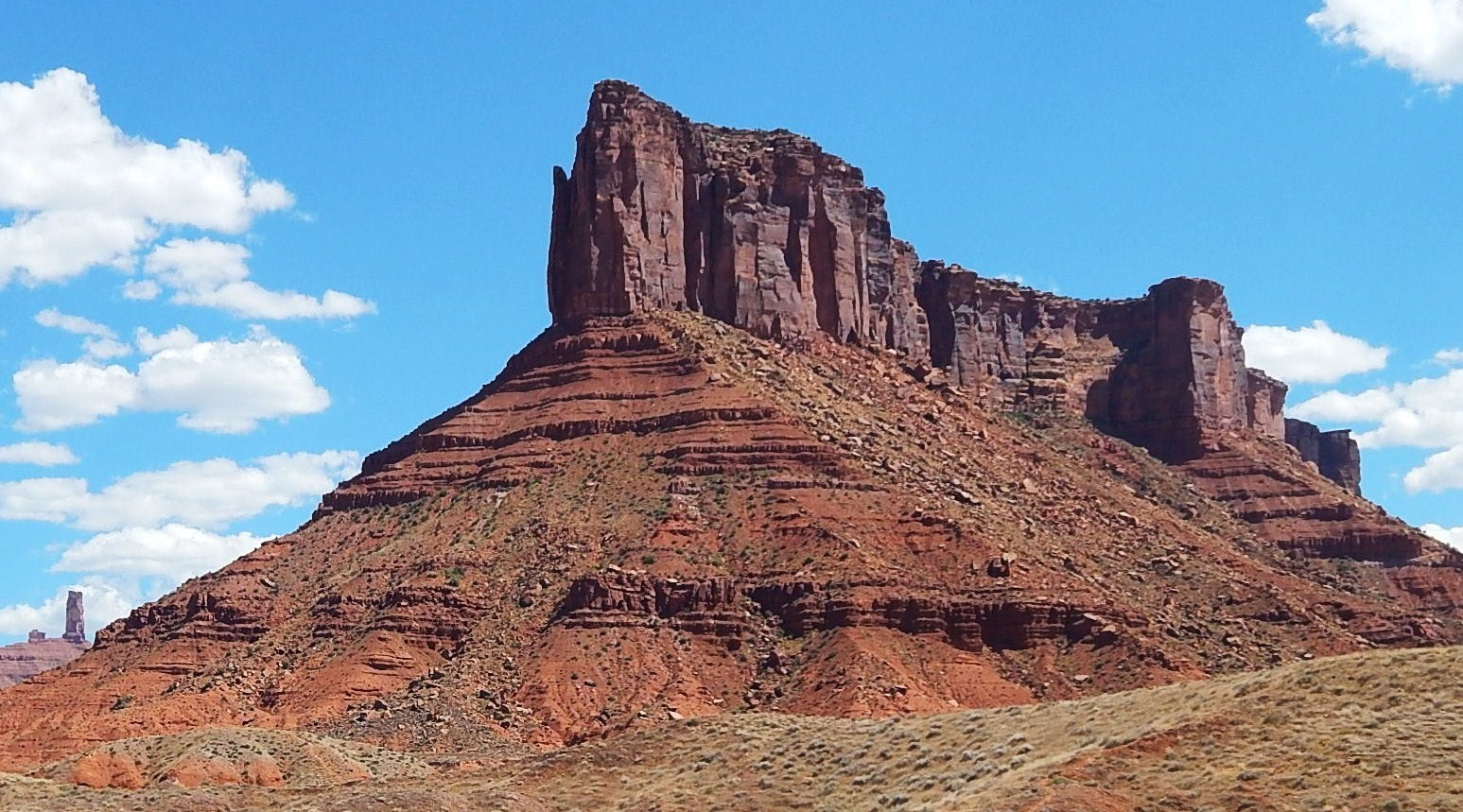
- Parriott Mesa seen from Utah State Route 128

Highest point
- Elevation: 6,155 ft (1,876 m)
- Prominence: 1,075 ft (328 m)
- Coordinates: 38°39′36″N 109°24′06″W

Geography
- Location within Utah Location within the United States
- Country: United States
- State: Utah
- County: Grand
- Parent range: Colorado Plateau
- Topo map: USGS Big Bend

Geology
- Mountain type: Mesa
- Rock type: Sandstone

Climbing
- Easiest route: Climbing

Parriott Mesa is a 6,155-foot-elevation sandstone summit in Grand County of Utah, United States. Parriott Mesa is located at Castle Valley, Utah, near the city of Moab. The name honors Dale M. Parriott (1885–1958), who was a Moab settler, and owned a ranch house in Castle Valley. Parriott Mesa is a thin 0.4 mile wide, and 1.5 mile long north-to-south mesa with 400 ft vertical Wingate Sandstone walls. Precipitation runoff from the mesa drains into the Colorado River which is about a mile away. The nearest higher peak is The Priest, 1.76 miles (2.83 km) to the east.

== Climate ==
Spring and fall are the most favorable seasons to visit, when highs average 60 to 80 °F and lows average 30 to 50 °F. Summer temperatures often exceed 100 °F. Winters are cold, with highs averaging 30 to 50 °F, and lows averaging 0 to 20 °F. As part of a high desert region, it can experience wide daily temperature fluctuations. The area receives an average of less than 10 inches (25 cm) of rain annually.

== Climbing Routes ==
Classic climbing routes on Parriott Mesa

- Mountaineers Route - class 5.6 - 2 pitches
- Longbow Chimney - class 5.8 - 2 pitches
- Monochrome Era - class 5.11+ - 2 pitches
- Ascended Yoga Masters - class 5.10 - 5 pitches
- Hot Yoga - class 5.11 - 5 pitches
- Voodoo Child - class 5.11+ - 4 pitches
- Skin Ambivalence - class 5.12- - 2 pitches
- Super Natural - class 5.10 - 5 pitches
- Happy Ending - class 5.11

== Gallery ==
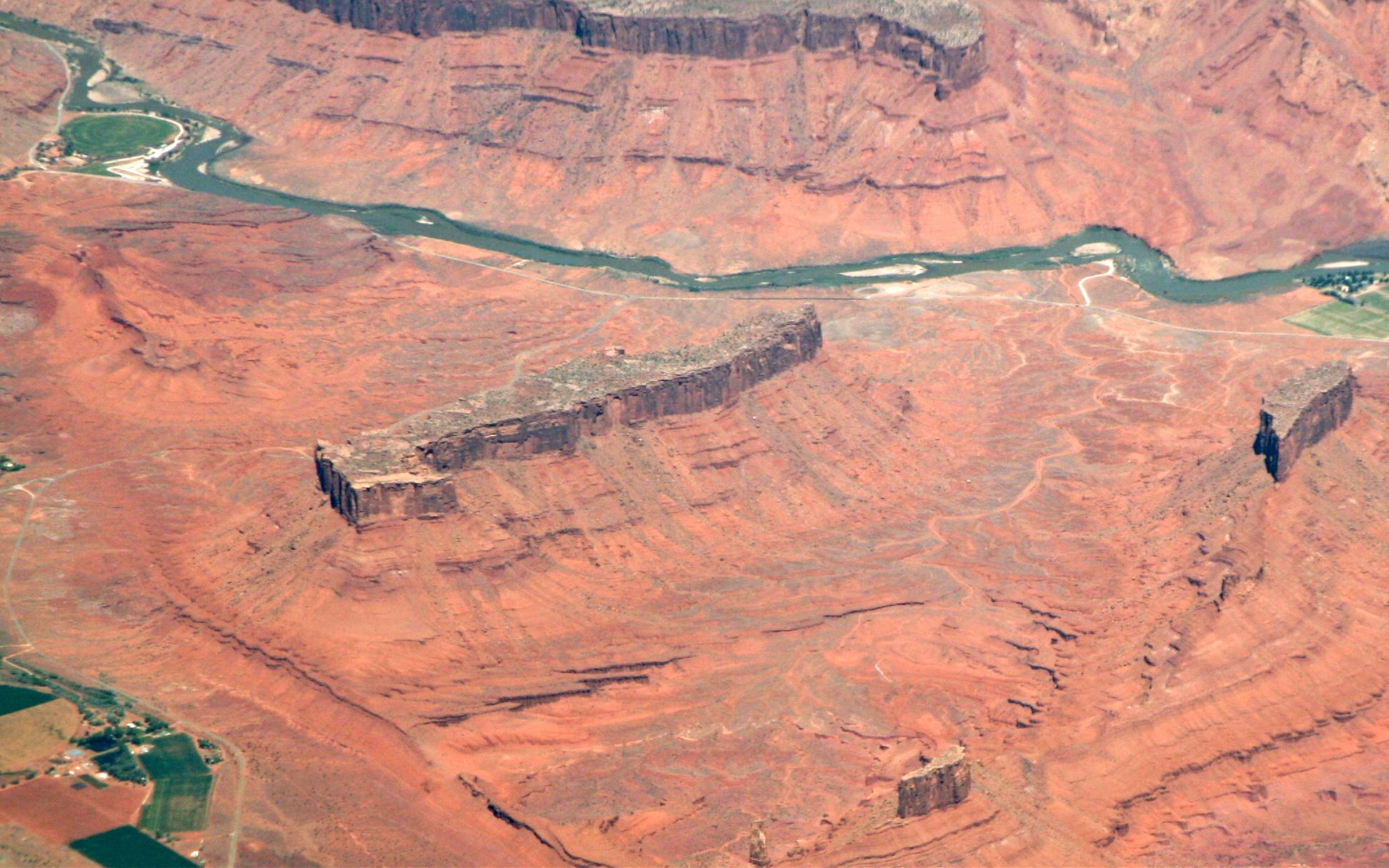
Parriott Mesa centered in this aerial view. Colorado River at top, Convent Mesa to far right, and The Rectory at bottom

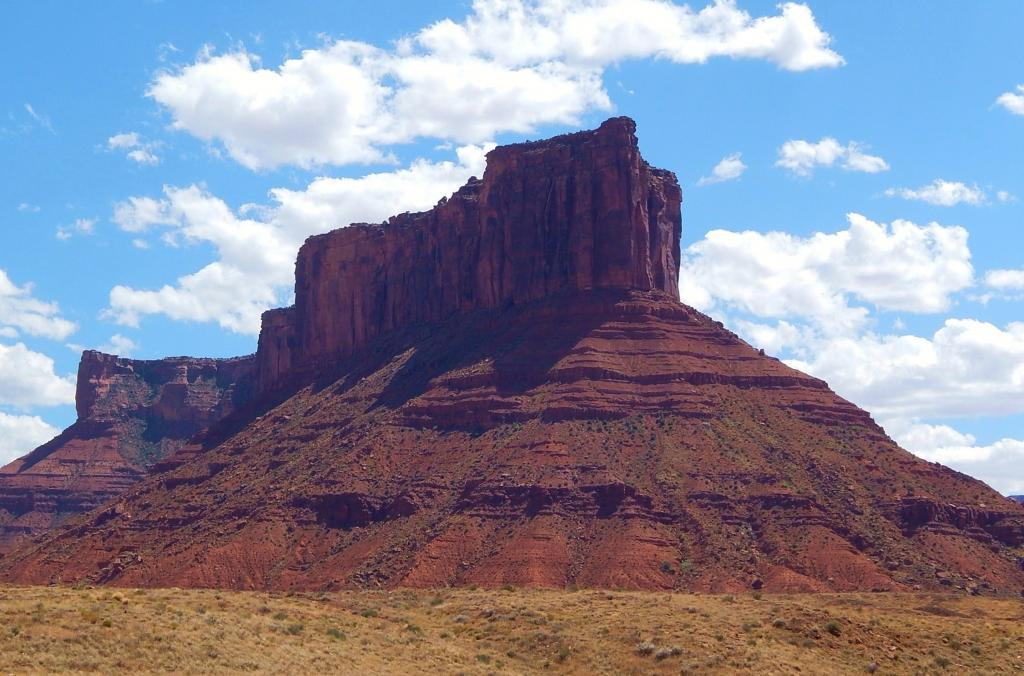
Parriott Mesa

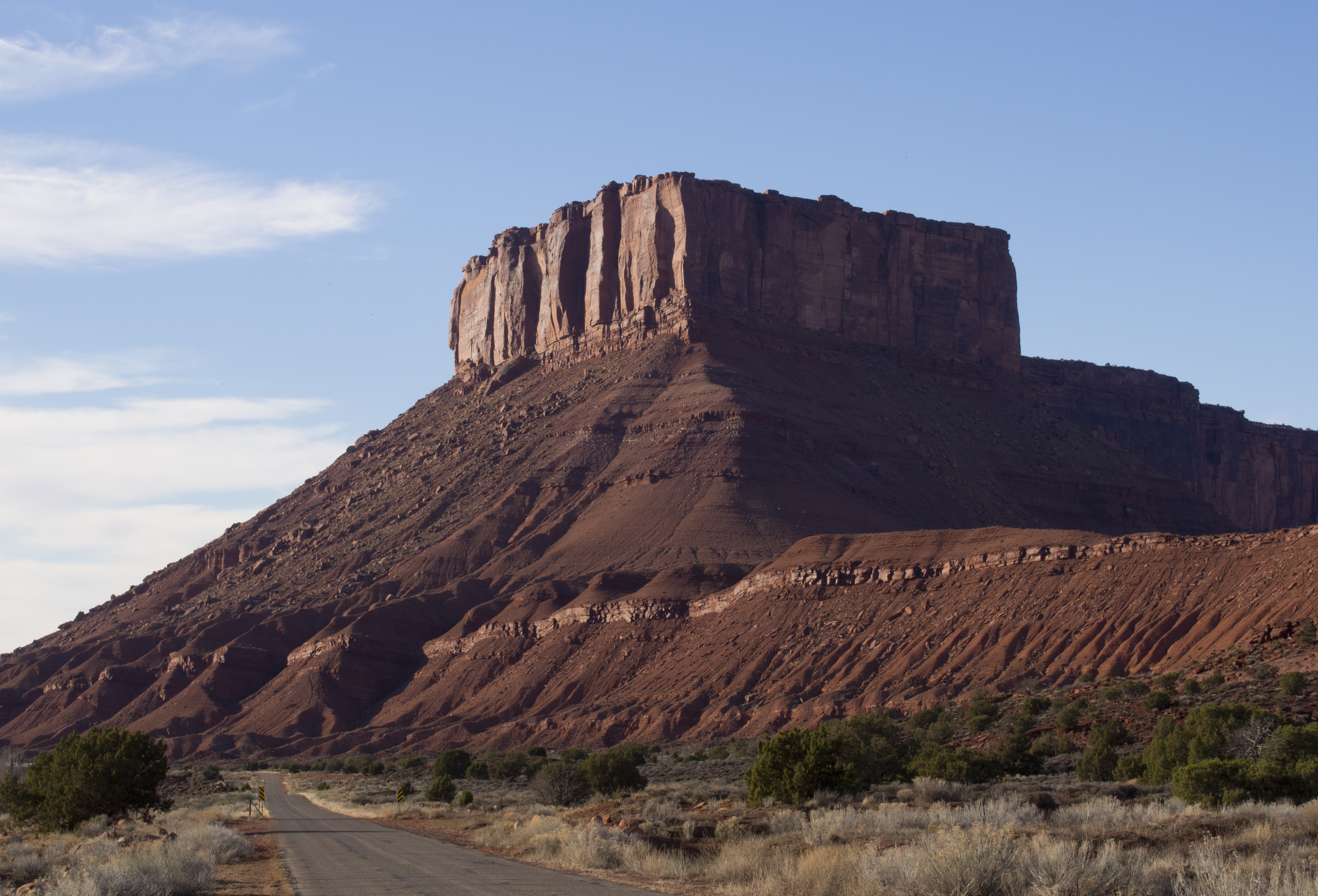
Parriott Mesa from Castle Valley

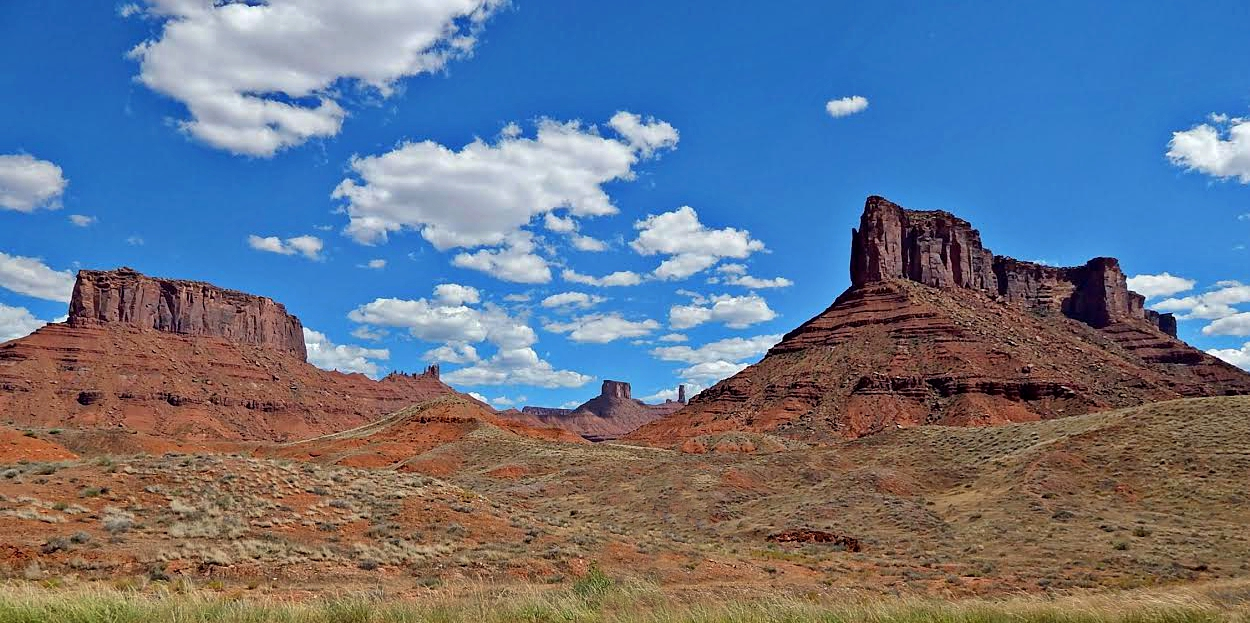
Convent Mesa (left) and Parriott Mesa (right) seen from Utah State Route 128 The Rectory and Castleton Tower centered in the distance

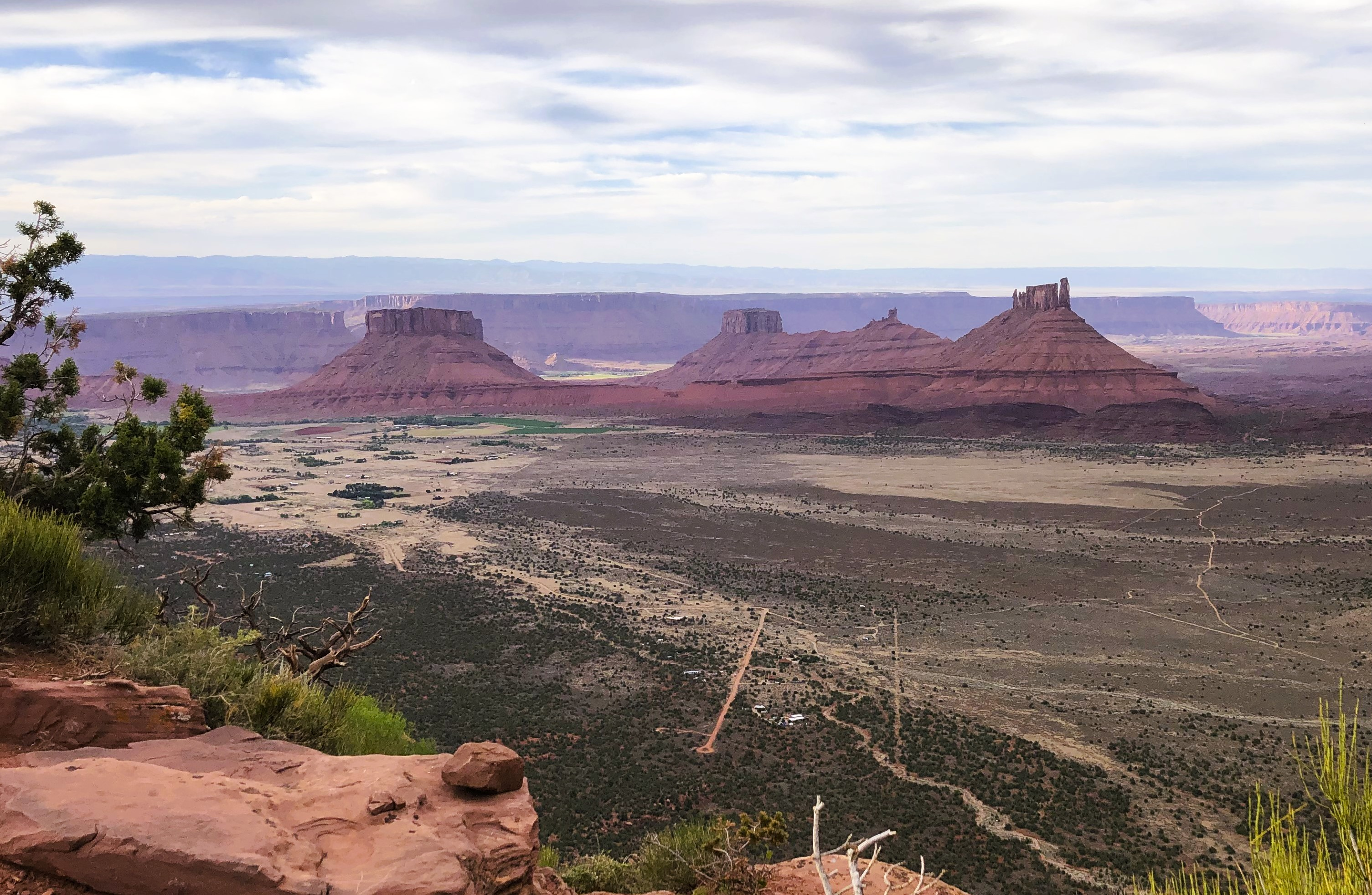
View of Castle Valley from Porcupine Rim with Parriott Mesa to the left.

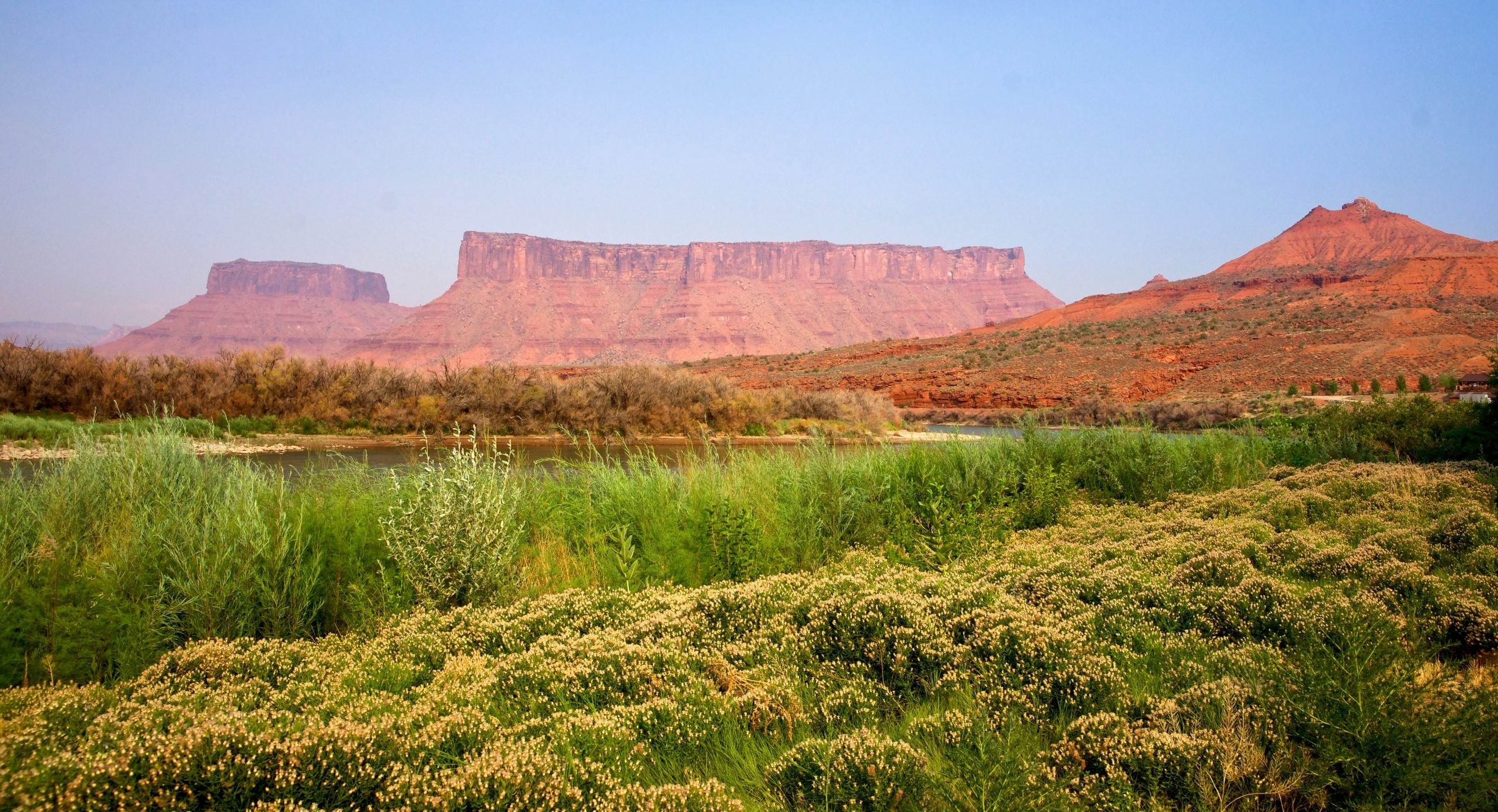
West aspect of Parriott Mesa centered, with Convent Mesa to left.
