= The Titan (Fisher Towers) =

Rock pillar in Utah, United States

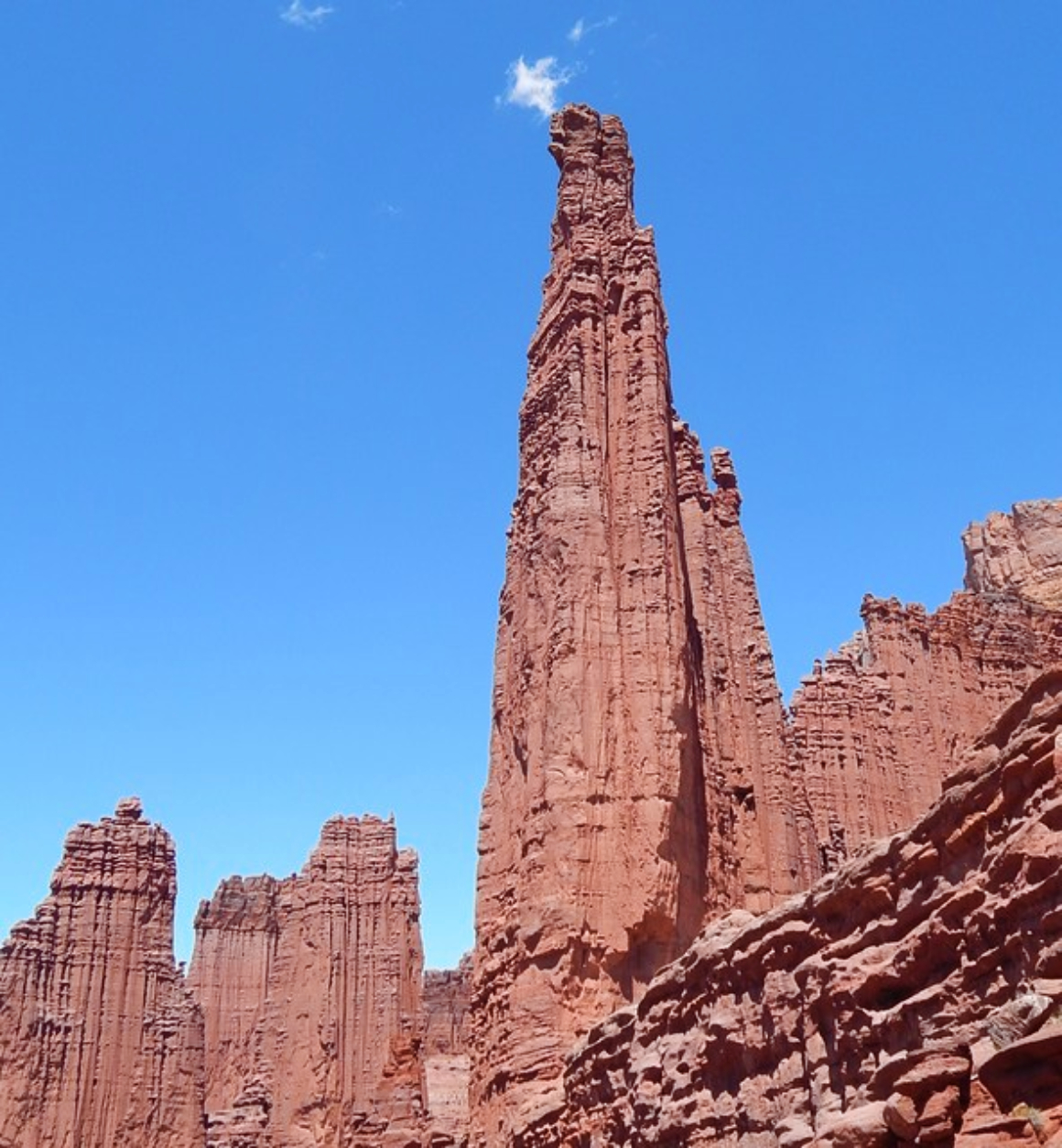
- The Titan, south aspect

Highest point
- Elevation: 6,112 ft (1,863 m)
- Prominence: 611 ft (186 m)Peak 6825
- Parent peak: Peak 6825
- Isolation: 0.56 mi (0.90 km)
- Coordinates: 38°43′01″N 109°17′58″W

Geography
- Location within Utah Location within the United States
- Country: United States
- State: Utah
- County: Grand
- Parent range: Colorado Plateau
- Topo map: USGS Fisher Towers

Geology
- Rock age: Permian
- Mountain type: Pillar
- Rock type: Sandstone

Climbing
- First ascent: 1962

The Titan is a 6,112-foot-elevation (1,863-meter) pillar in Grand County, Utah, United States.

== Description ==
The Titan is located 17 miles (27 km) northeast of Moab, Utah, in the Fisher Towers, on land administered by the Bureau of Land Management. It is the largest of the Fisher Towers which are near Castle Valley. The Titan is the steepest peak in the United States. It has also been attributed to be the largest, free-standing, natural tower in the United States. The tower contains the Finger of Fate Route, first climbed in 1962, which is recognized in the historic climbing text Fifty Classic Climbs of North America and considered a classic around the world. Topographic relief is significant as the summit rises 900 feet (274 meters) above the tower's base. Precipitation runoff from the tower drains to Onion Creek which empties into the Colorado River, approximately three miles to the west. Access is via Fisher Towers Road from Route 128 and hiking the Fisher Towers Trail. The Titan should not be confused with Titan Tower which is 0.8 mile to the east.

== Climbing ==
The first ascent of the summit was made on May 13, 1962, by Layton Kor, Huntley Ingalls, and George Hurley via the class 5.8 Finger of Fate route.

Rock-climbing routes on The Titan:

- Finger of Fate - class 5.8 – Layton Kor, Huntley Ingalls, George Hurley – (1962)
- Sundevil Chimney – class 5.9 – Harvey T. Carter, Tom Merrill, Bob Sullivan, Ken Wyrick – (1971)
- Naked Lunch – class 5.10 – Duane Raleigh, Pete Takeda
- World's End – Jim Beyer – (1986)
- Gimp Warfare – class 5.8 – Paul Gagner, Jeremy Aslaksen – (2010)
- Jade Gate – Jim Beyer

== Geology ==
The Titan is composed of sandstone and mudstone of the Permian Cutler Formation with an Early Triassic Moenkopi Formation caprock. There is an unconformity between the Cutler and the Moenkopi layers. The reddish coloration of the rock is a result of varying amounts of hematite.

== See also ==
- Fisher Towers
- Kingfisher Tower

== Gallery ==
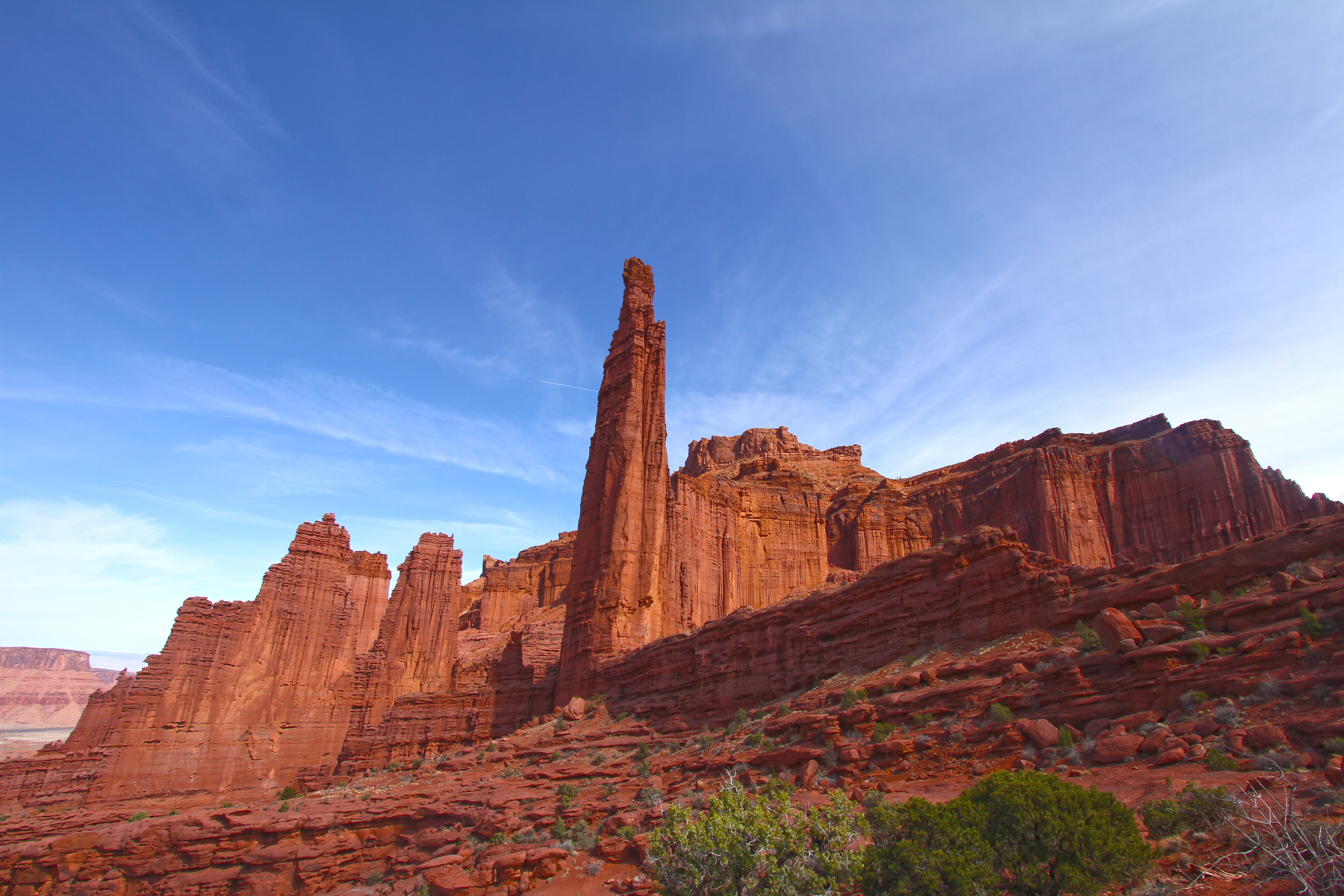

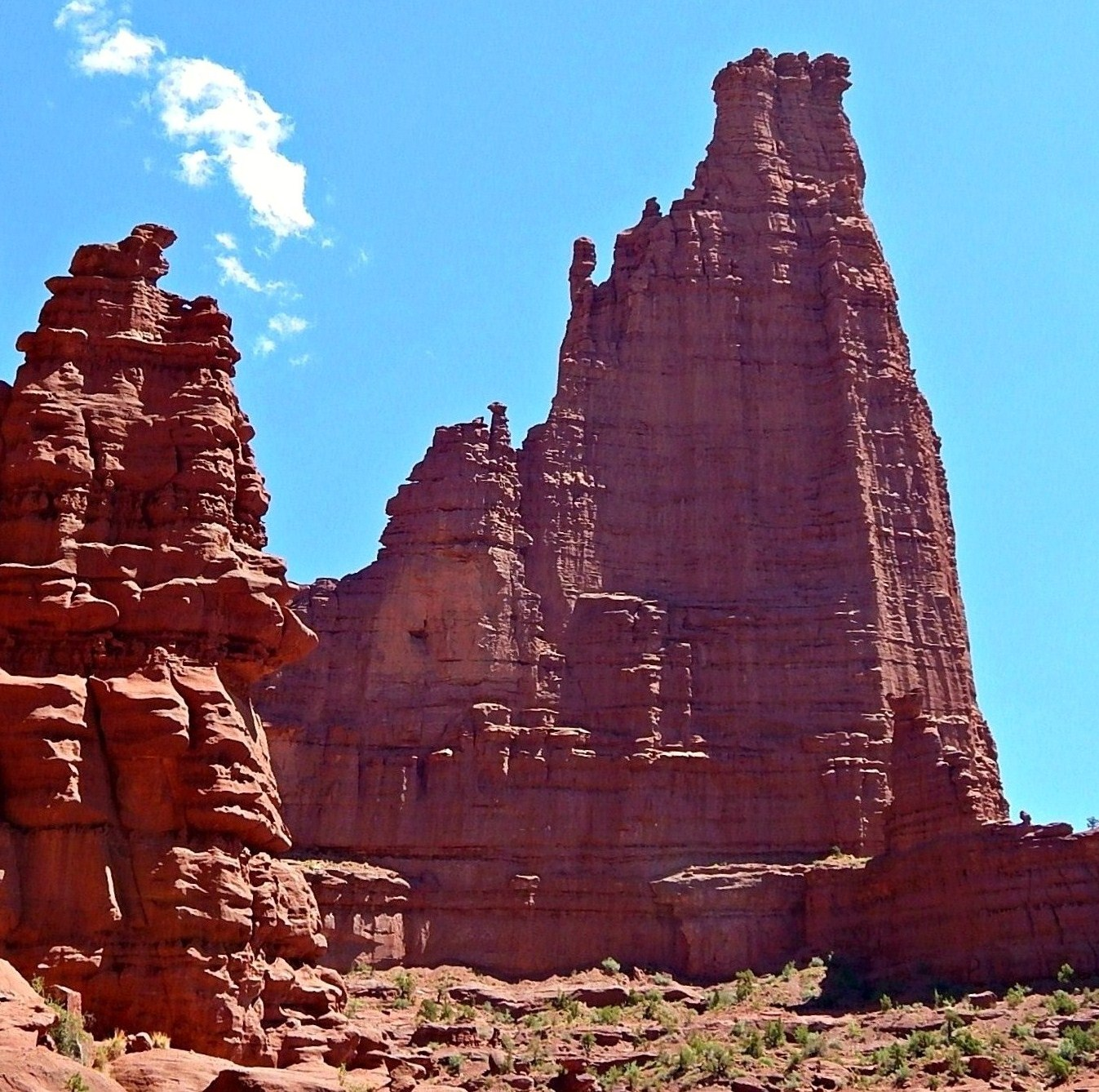
Northwest aspect

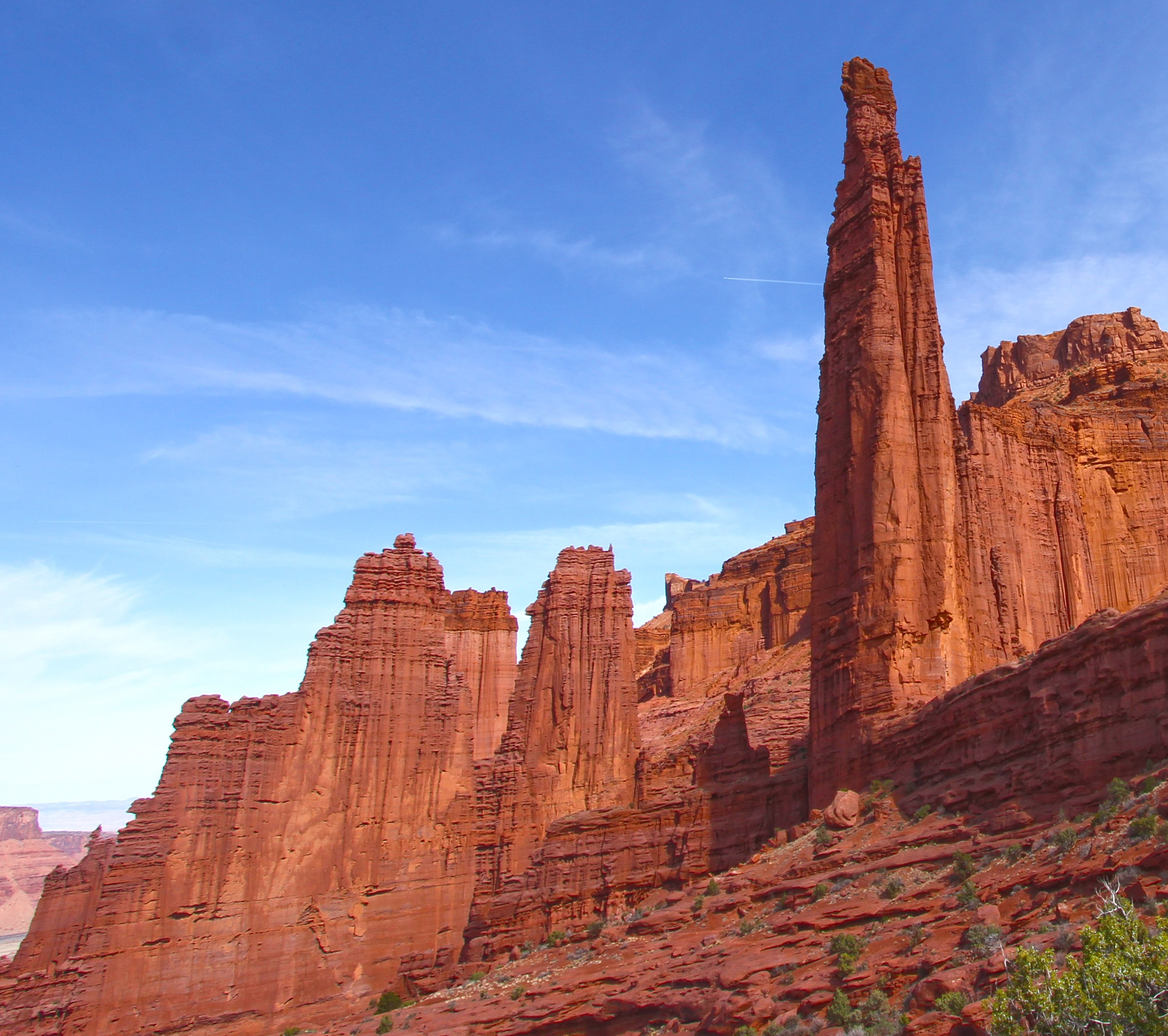
Cottontail Tower (left), Echo Tower (center), The Titan (right) viewed from the south

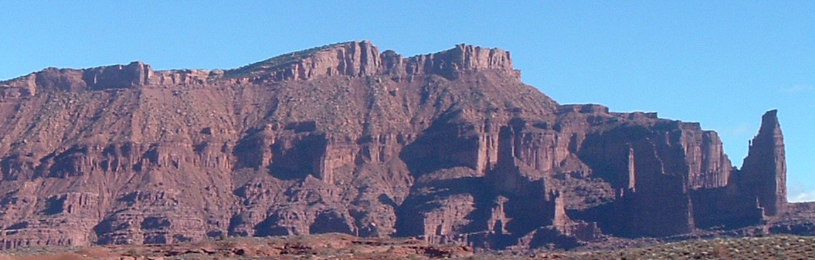
The Titan to far right

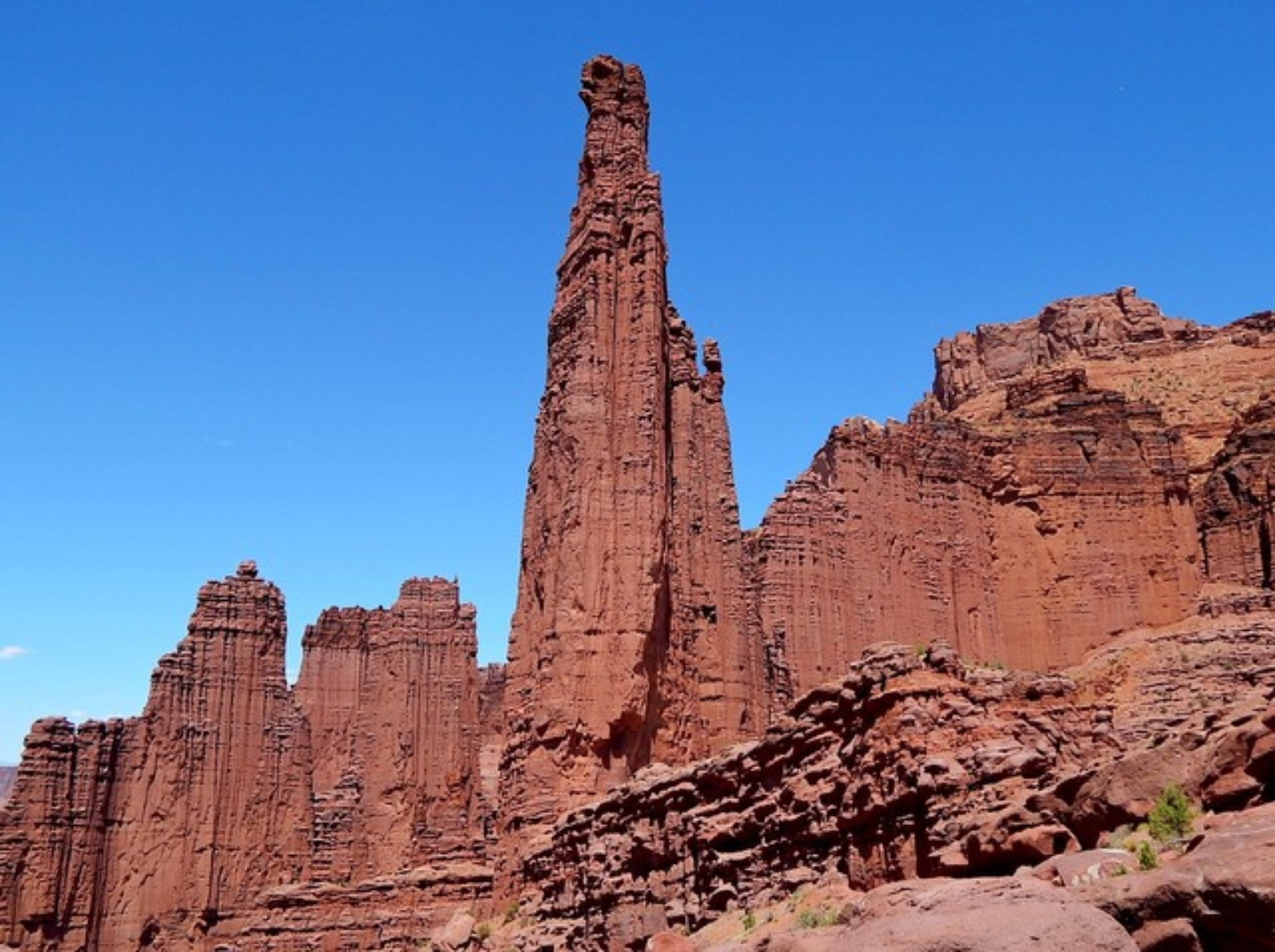

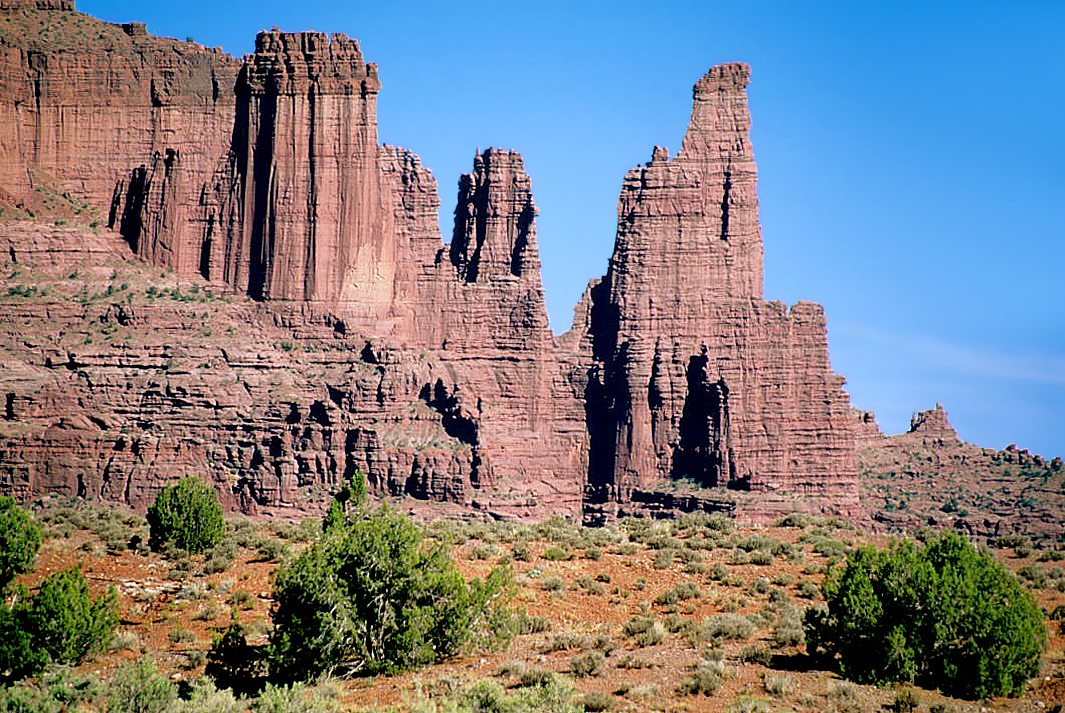
Viewed from the north: Kingfisher (left), Echo (center), Cottontail/Titan (right)
