= Cottontail Tower =

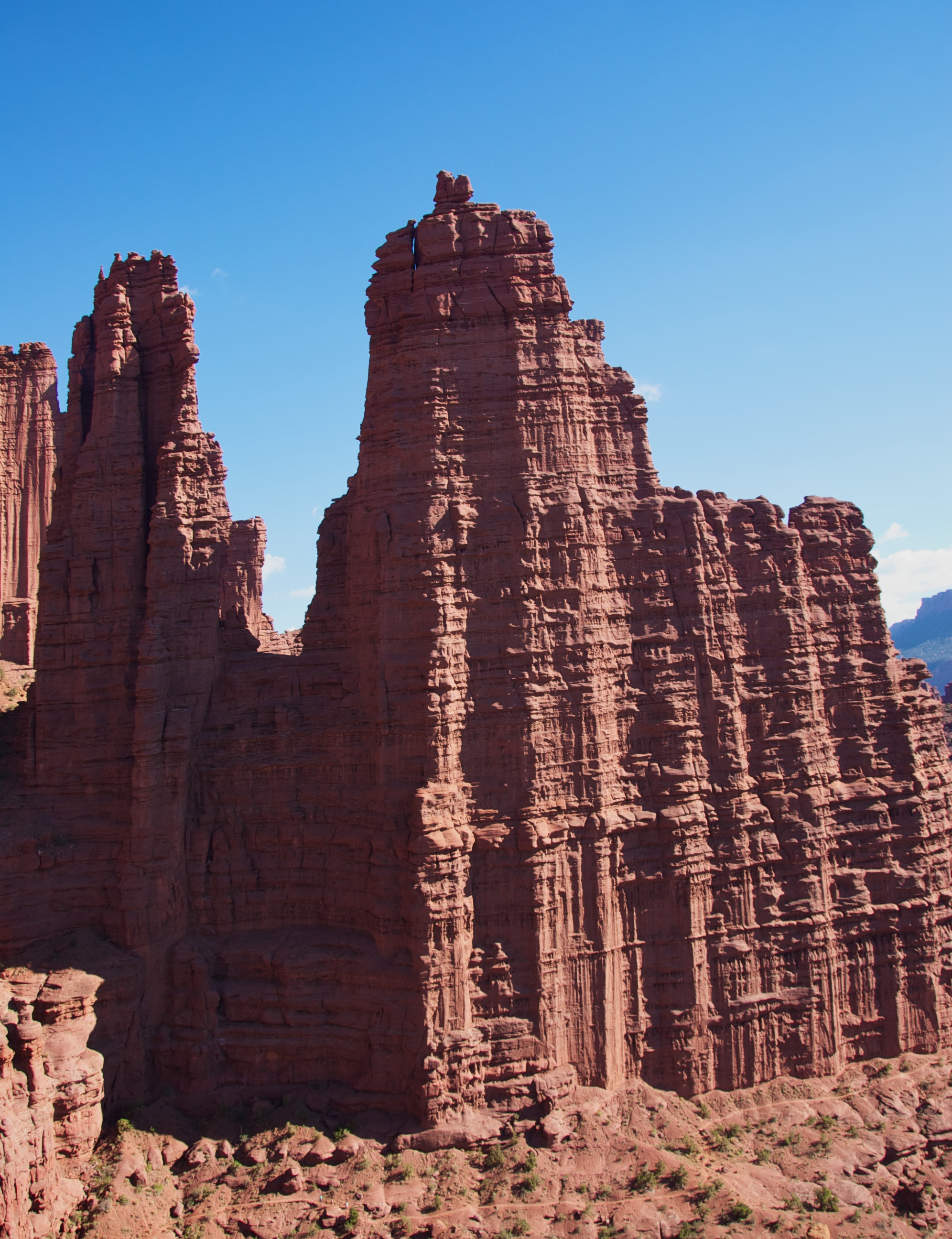
- Northwest aspect, centered

Highest point
- Elevation: 5,980 ft (1,823 m)
- Prominence: 480 ft (146 m)
- Parent peak: Kingfisher Tower
- Isolation: 0.19 mi (0.31 km)
- Coordinates: 38°43′11″N 109°18′06″W

Naming
- Etymology: Cottontail

Geography
- Location within Utah Location within the United States
- Country: United States
- State: Utah
- County: Grand
- Parent range: Colorado Plateau
- Topo map: USGS Fisher Towers

Geology
- Rock age: Permian
- Mountain type: Pillar
- Rock type: Sandstone

Climbing
- First ascent: 1967
- Easiest route: class 5.9

Cottontail Tower is a 5,980-foot-elevation (1,823-meter) pillar in Grand County, Utah, United States.

== Description ==
Cottontail Tower is located 17 miles (27 km) northeast of Moab, Utah, in the Fisher Towers, on land administered by the Bureau of Land Management. Cottontail ranks as the second-steepest peak in the United States, second only to nearby The Titan. Topographic relief is significant as the summit rises 800 feet (244 meters) above the tower's base. Precipitation runoff from the tower drains to Onion Creek which empties into the Colorado River, approximately three miles to the west. Access is via Fisher Towers Road from Route 128, and hiking one mile on the Fisher Towers Trail. This landform's descriptive toponym refers to the summit rock resembling the tail of a Cottontail rabbit. Cottontail Tower is briefly shown (as a parachute flies by) in the opening scene of the film Austin Powers in Goldmember.

== Climbing ==
The first ascent of the summit was made June 11, 1967, by Harvey T. Carter, Art Howells, Mike Dudley, Don Doucette, Morgan Gadd, and Herbie Hendricks via the class 5.9 West Side Story route on the northwest side of the tower.

Other rock-climbing routes on Cottontail Tower:

- Brer Rabbit - class 5.9 - Ed Webster (1978)
- Road Kill - class 5.9 - Earl Wiggins, Art Wiggins, Katy Cassidy (1987)
- Intifada - class 5.10 - Jim Beyer (1988)
- Not So Soft - class 5.8 - Shawn MacRoe, Chris Van Leuven (1999)
- Trick of the Tail - class 5.10+ - Paul Gagner, Jeremy Aslaksen (2011)
- Free Gaza - Jim Beyer (2014)
- Line in the Sand - Richard Jensen, Scott Peterson (2017)

== Geology ==
Cottontail Tower is set on a fin and is composed of two principal strata of sandstone and mudstone: Permian Cutler Formation capped by Early Triassic Moenkopi Formation. There is an unconformity between the Cutler and the Moenkopi layers. The reddish coloration of the rock is a result of varying amounts of hematite.

== Climate ==
Spring and fall are the most favorable seasons to visit Cottontail Tower. According to the Köppen climate classification system, it is located in a cold semi-arid climate zone with cold winters and hot summers. Summers highs rarely exceed 100 °F (38 °C). Summer nights are comfortably cool, and temperatures drop quickly after sunset. Winters are cold, but daytime highs are usually above freezing. Winter temperatures below 0 °F (−18 °C) are uncommon, though possible. This desert climate receives less than 10 inches (250 millimeters) of annual rainfall, and snowfall is generally light during the winter.

== See also ==
- Fisher Towers
- The Titan

== Gallery ==
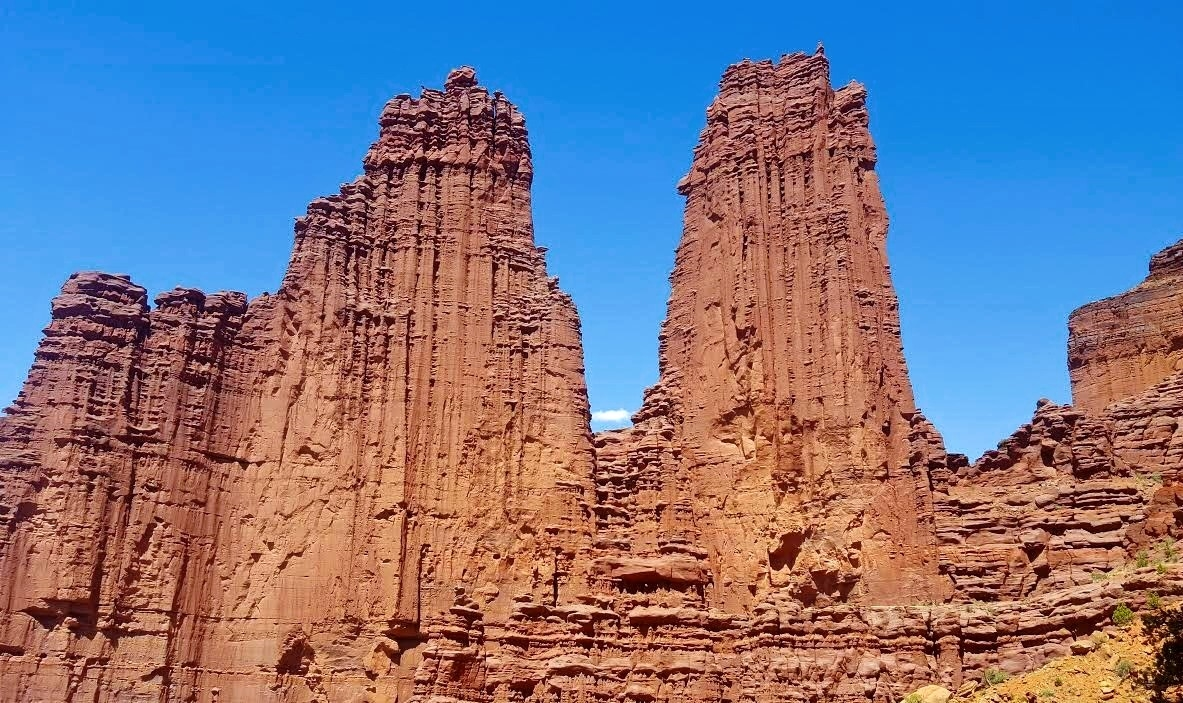
South aspect of Cottontail Tower (left), Echo Tower to right

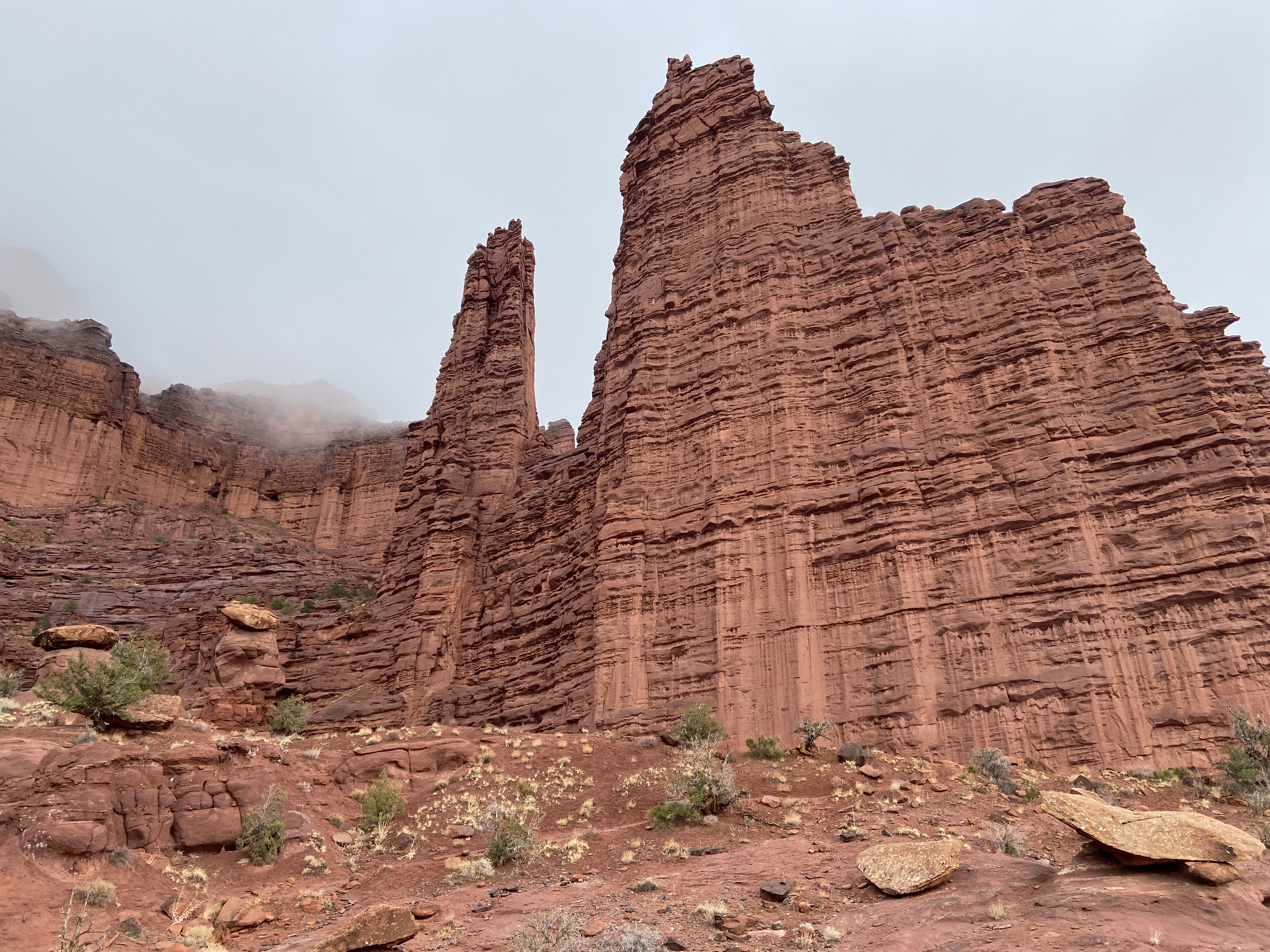
Cottontail, with Echo Tower to left

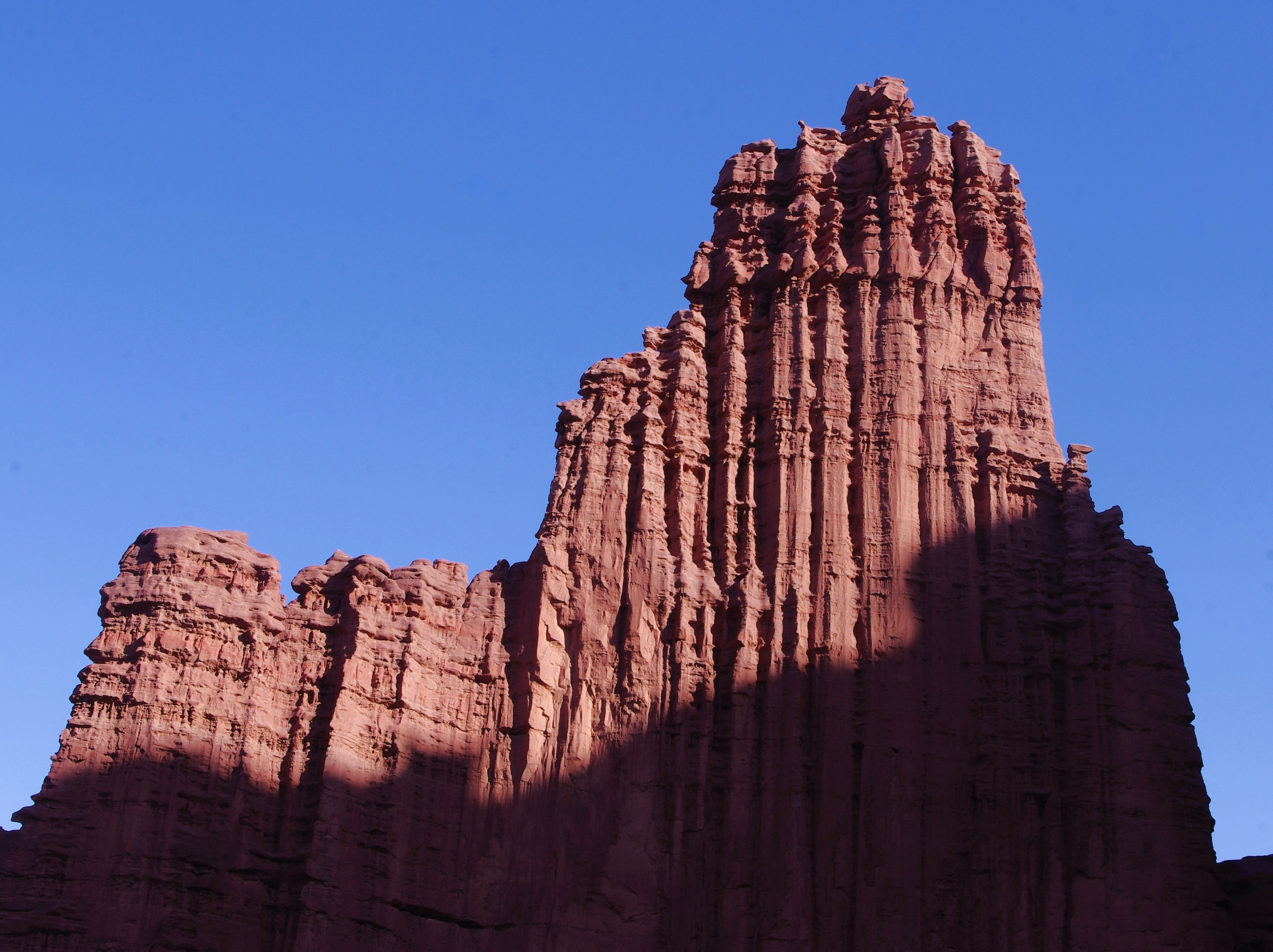
South aspect

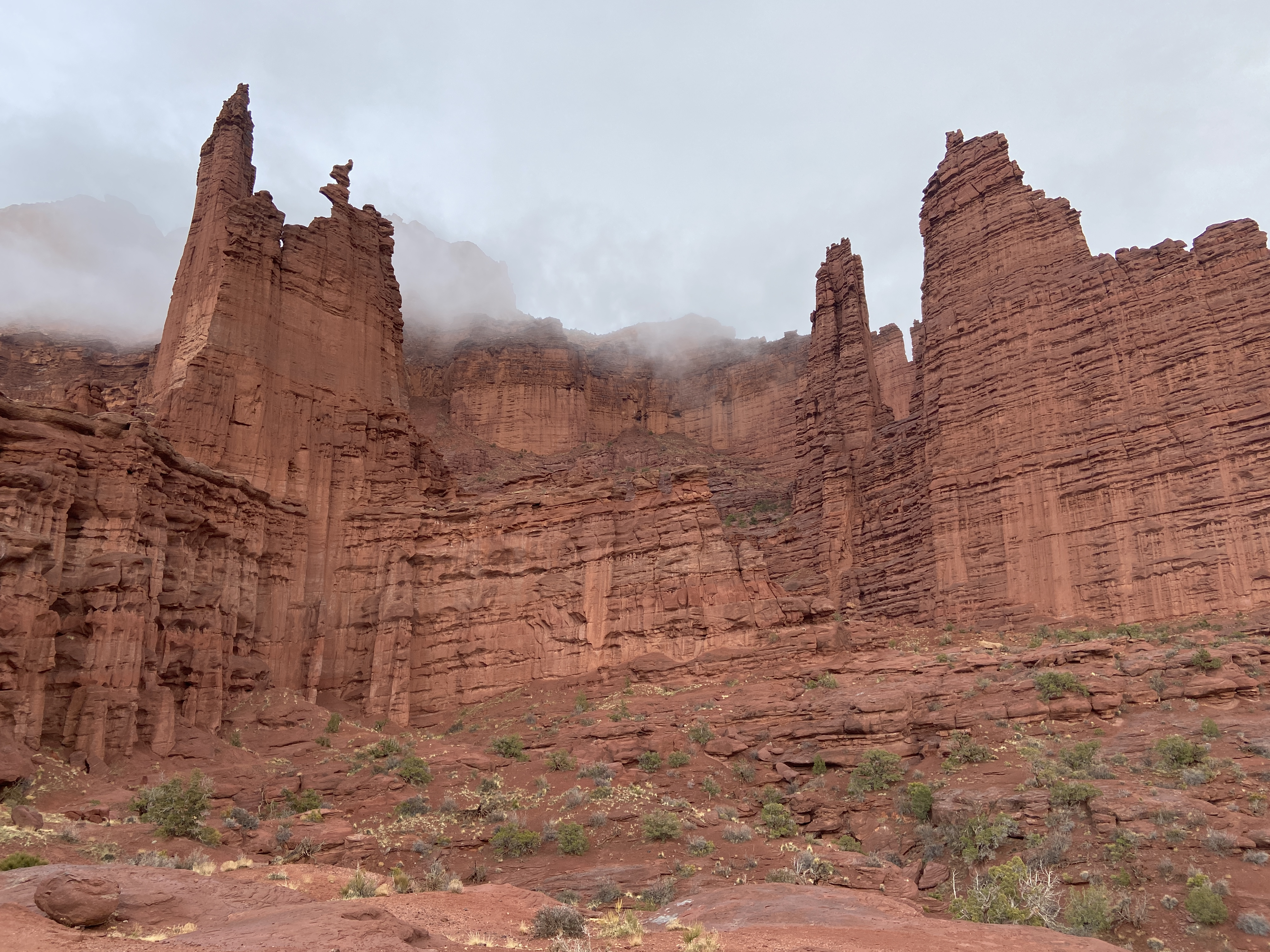
Kingfisher/Ancient Art to left, Cottontail to right

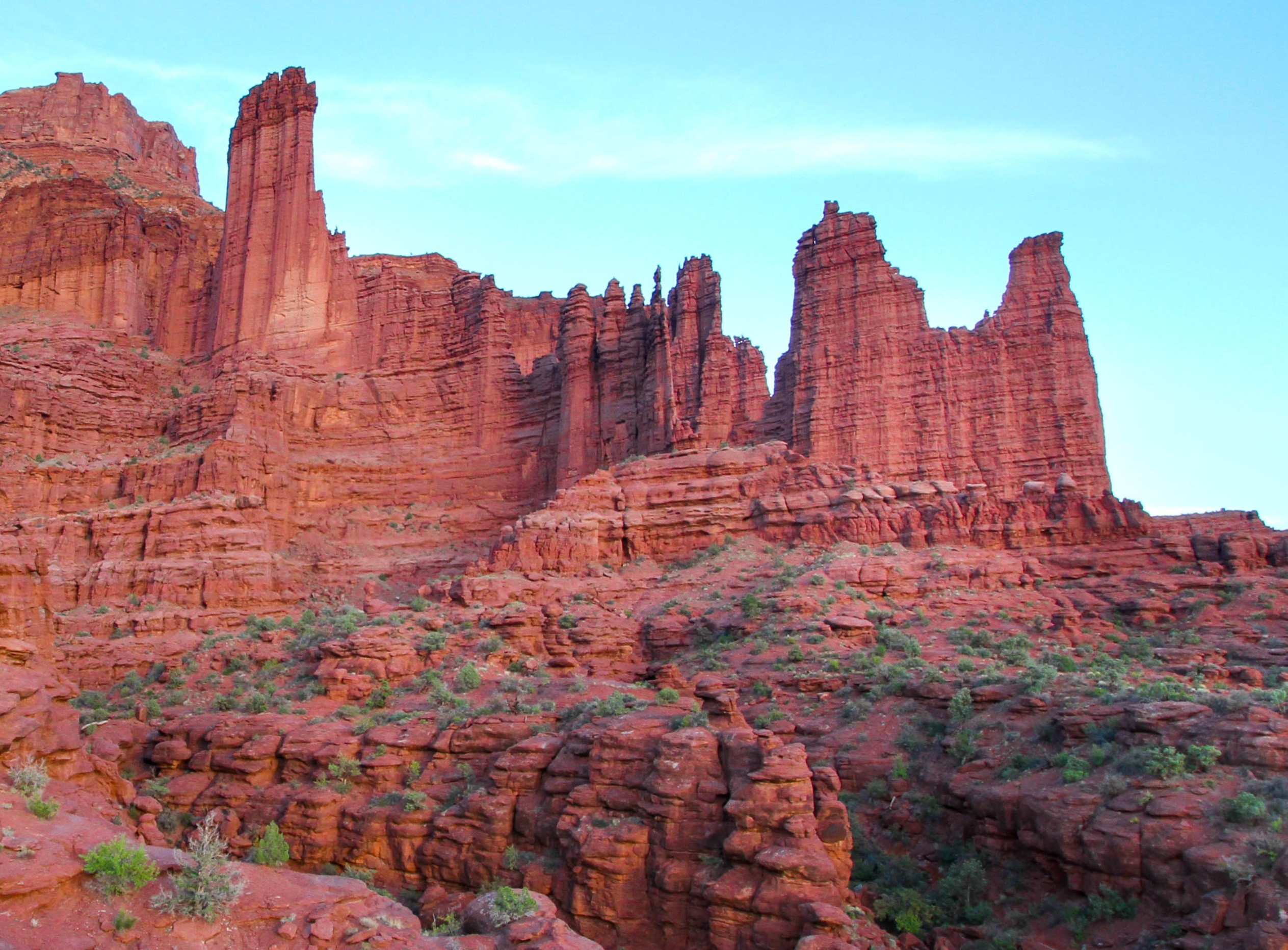
Fisher Towers L→R: Kingfisher, Ancient Art, Cottontail, Titan.

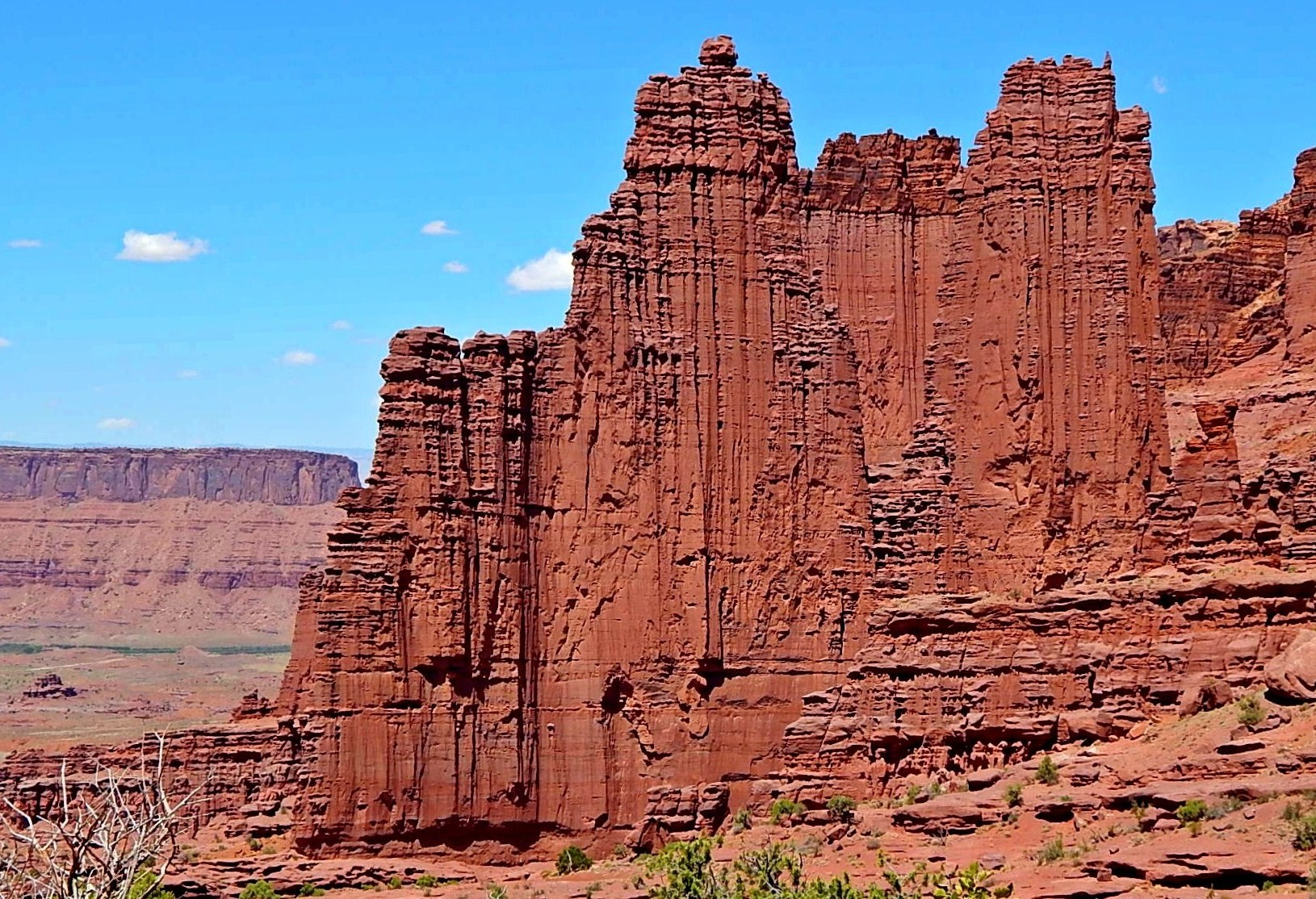
South aspect of Cottontail Tower centered, Echo Tower to right, and Kingfisher fills in the V-gap between.

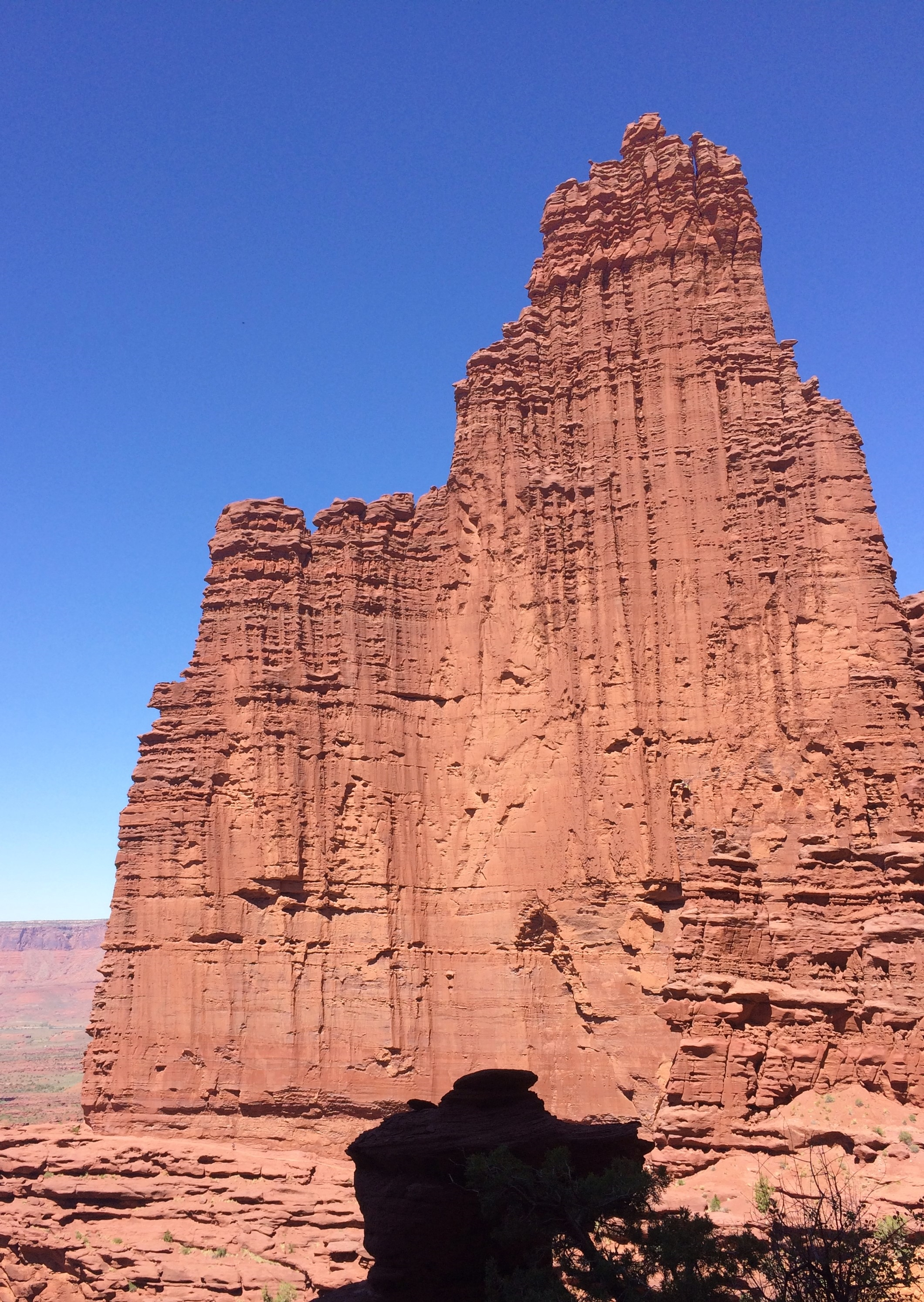
South aspect

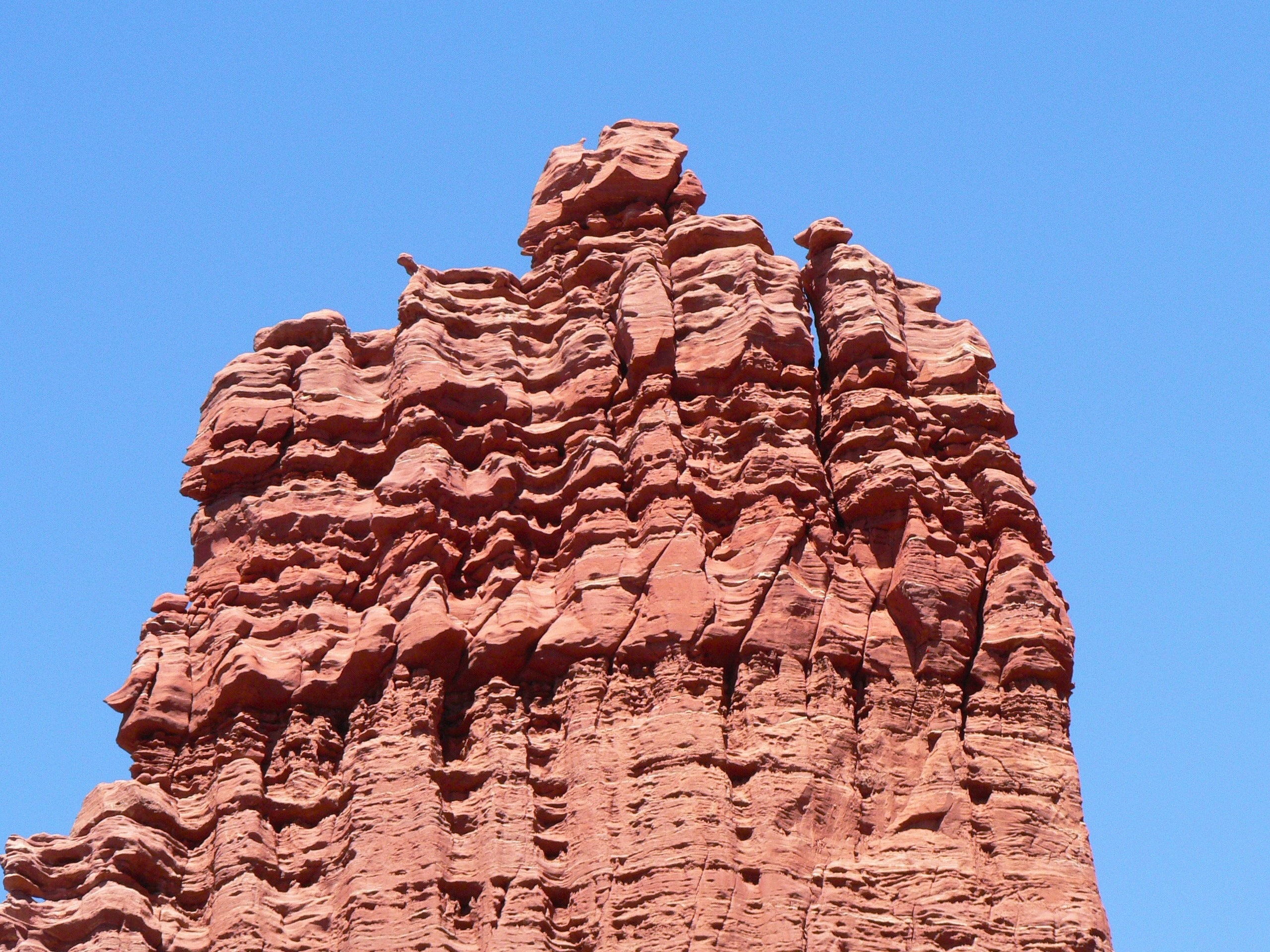
Summit detail, south aspect.
