= Islet in the Sky =

- Pillar
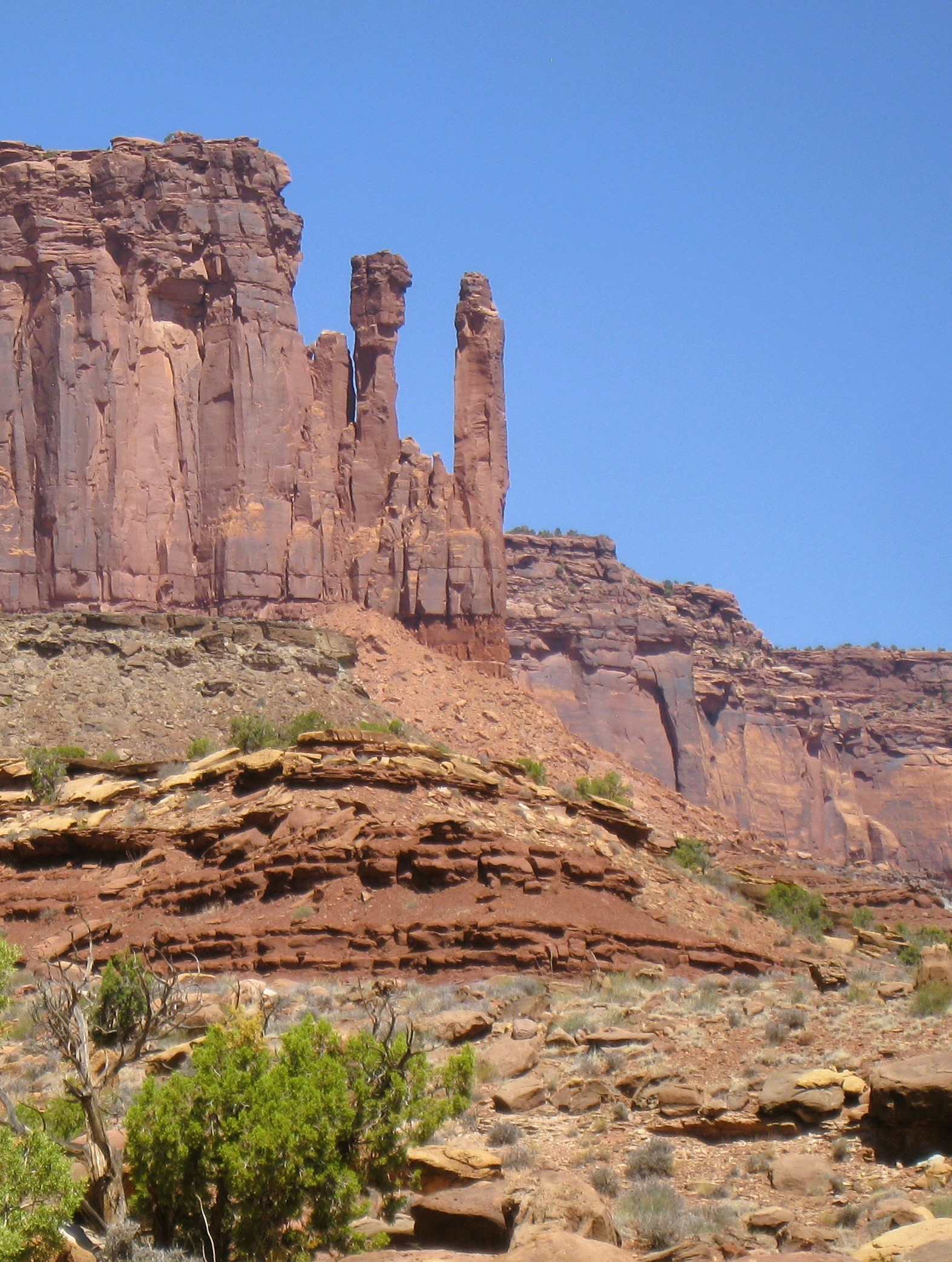
- Southeast aspect, centered ("Blocktop" is the tower to left)

- Location within Utah Location within the United States
- Coordinates: 38°21′50″N 109°51′06″W
- Location: Canyonlands National Park; San Juan County, Utah, U.S.
- Age: Late Triassic
- Geology: Wingate Sandstone

Dimensions
  - Height: 208 ft (63 m)
- Elevation: 5,914 ft (1,803 m)
- Topo map: USGS Monument Basin

Islet in the Sky is a sandstone pillar located within Canyonlands National Park, in San Juan County, Utah, United States. It is situated in the Island in the Sky District of the park, one mile (1.6 km) east of the Island in the Sky paved road that leads to Grand View Point. This spire is composed of Wingate Sandstone, which is the remains of wind-borne sand dunes deposited approximately 200 million years ago in the Late Triassic. Precipitation runoff from Islet in the Sky drains east to the nearby Colorado River via Buck Canyon. Access is via the White Rim Road which traverses between this remote spire and the river.

== Climbing ==
The first ascent of the summit was made by Ken Trout and Bruce Lella on November 22, 1979, via the north side. The climbing route is rated class 5.10+ A3. Steve Bartlett climbed a new route, solo, in 1996.

== Climate ==
According to the Köppen climate classification system, Islet in the Sky is located in a cold semi-arid climate zone, which is defined by the coldest month having an average mean temperature below 32 °F (0 °C) and at least 50% of the total annual precipitation being received during the spring and summer. This desert climate receives less than 10 inches (250 millimeters) of annual rainfall, and snowfall is generally light during the winter. Spring and fall are the most favorable seasons to visit Islet in the Sky.

== See also ==
- Geology of the Canyonlands area
- Colorado Plateau
