= Finger of Fate (Fisher Towers) =

Rock climbing route in Moab, Utah

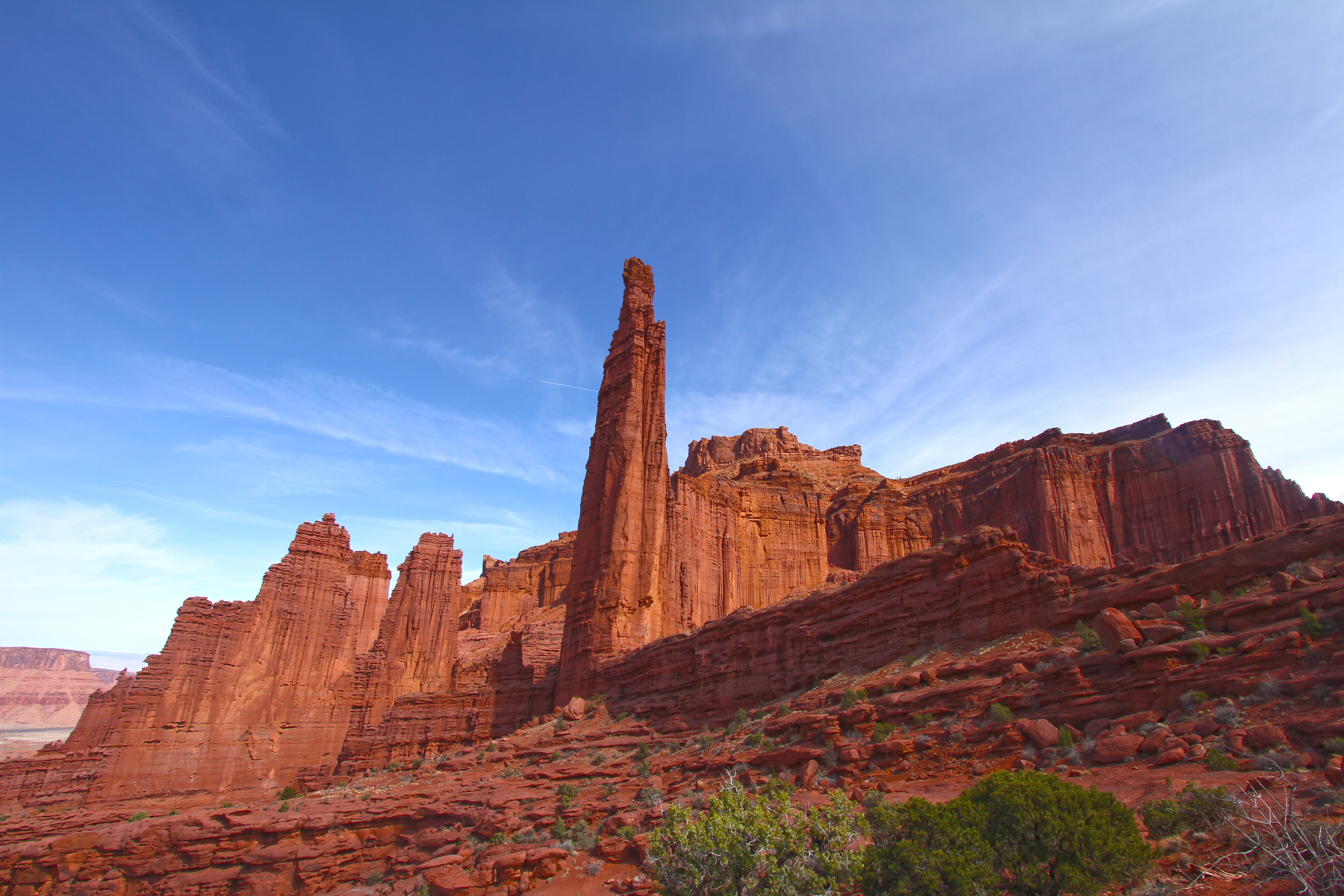
- The Titan
- Location: Moab, Utah, USA
- Coordinates: 38.7175°N 109.300°W
- Climbing area: The Titan, Fisher Towers
- Route type: Aid climbing
- Vertical gain: 900 feet (270 m)
- Pitches: 9
- Technical grade: 5.8 & A2+ or 5.12 & C3
- NCCS grade: IV
- First ascent: Layton Kor, George Hurley, and Huntley Ingalls, May 12–13, 1962.

Finger of Fate is a big wall aid climbing route located in Moab, Utah, on the Titan, the tallest of the Fisher Towers. It was first climbed in 1962. The route saw its first clean ascent in 1996 by Stevie Haston and Laurence Gauoult. The route is recognized in the historic climbing text Fifty Classic Climbs of North America and is considered a classic around the world.

== Gallery ==
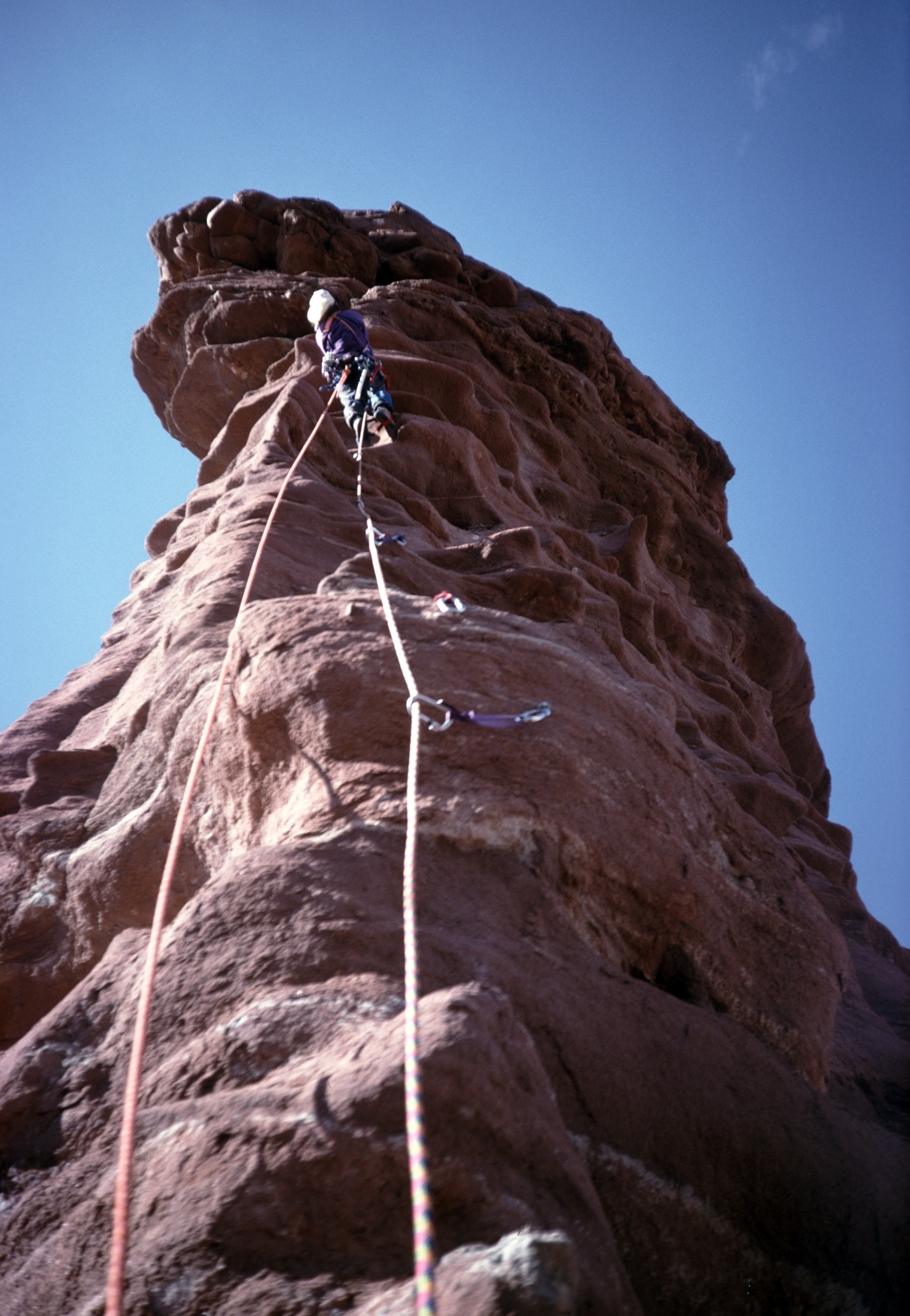

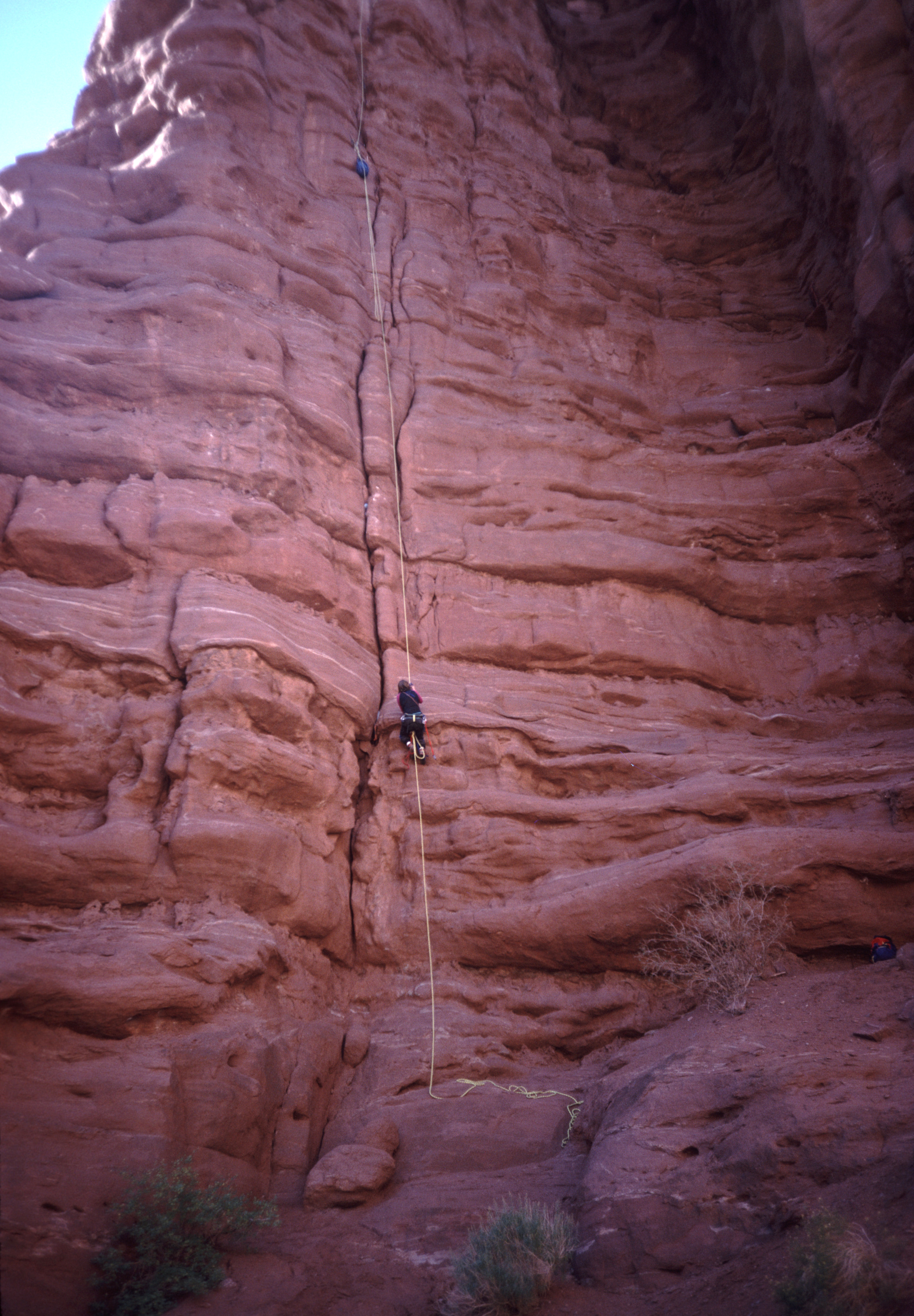

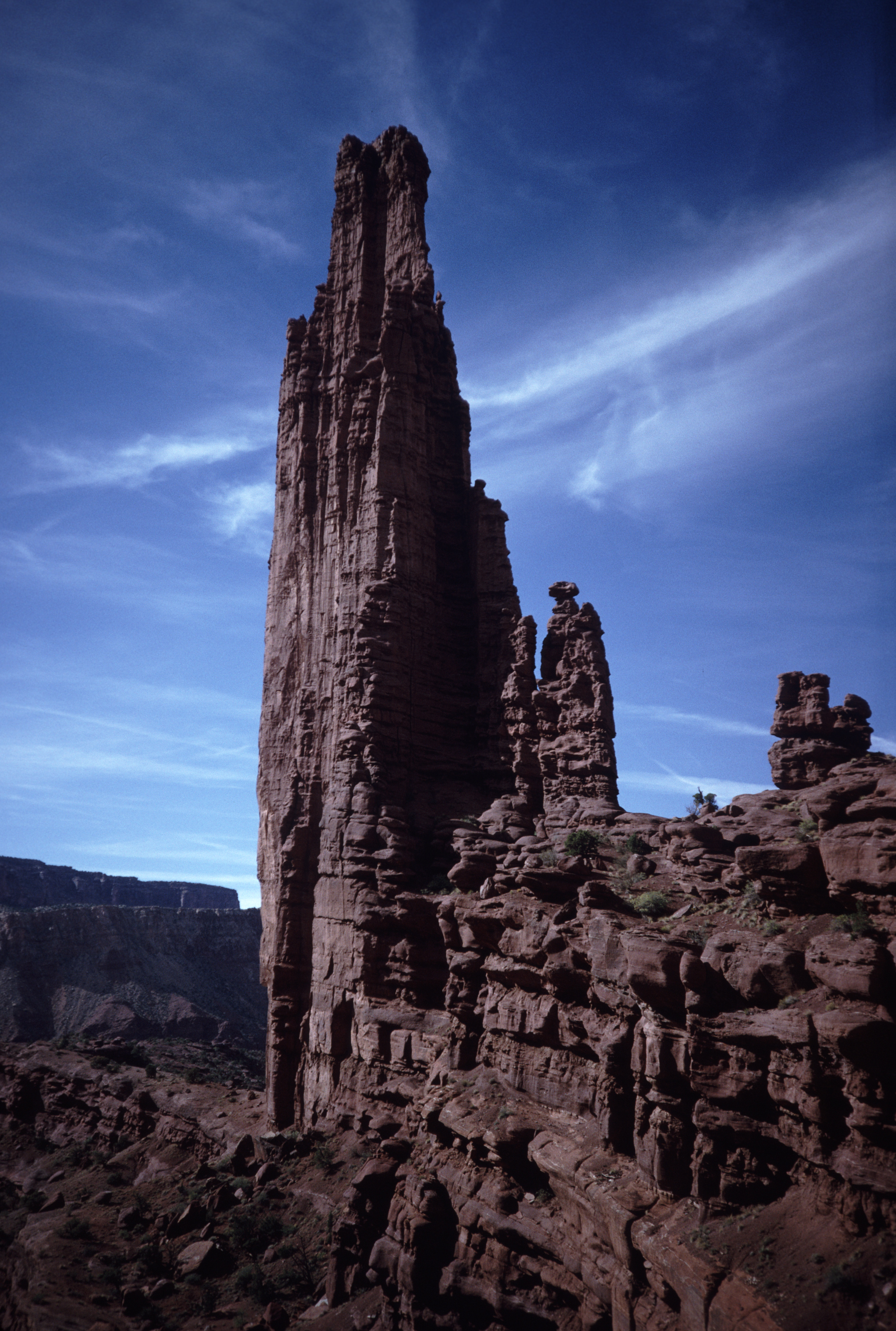
