= Layton Kor =

American rock climber

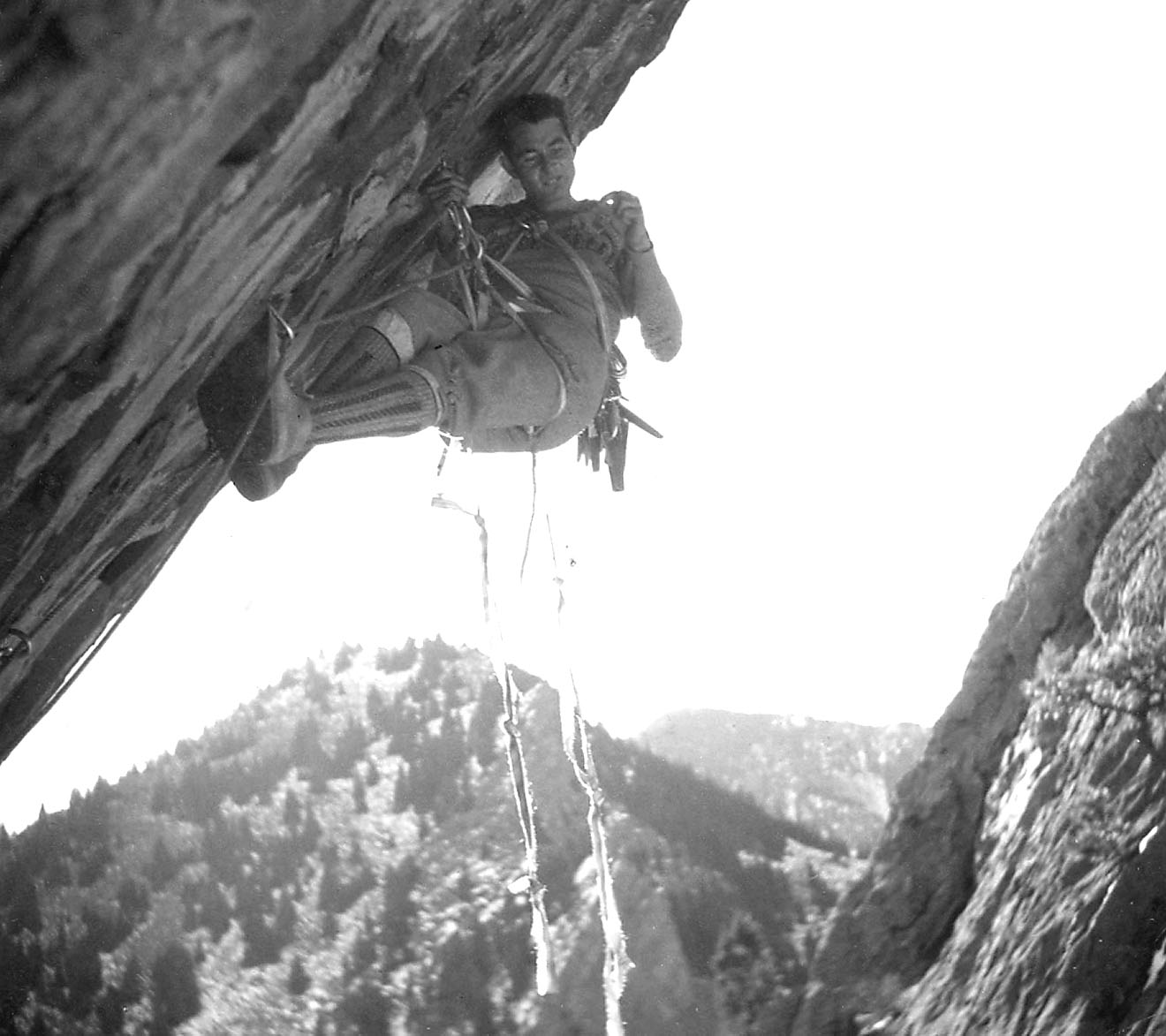
- Layton Kor, in Eldorado Canyon, on the climb "Exhibit A"
- Born: June 11, 1938; Canby, Minnesota
- Died: April 21, 2013 (aged 74)
- Occupation: Rock Climber
- Height: 1.90 m (6 ft 3 in)

Layton Kor (June 11, 1938 – April 21, 2013) was an American rock climber active in the 1960s, whose first ascents and drive for climbing are well known in the climbing world. His routes included many climbs in Eldorado Canyon, near Boulder, Colorado, The Diamond on Longs Peak, towers in the desert southwest, and Yosemite National Park, among other locations. Notable among his first ascents is the Kor-Ingalls Route on Castleton Tower and The Finger of Fate Route up the Fisher Towers' Titan; both routes are recognized in the historic climbing text Fifty Classic Climbs of North America.

Kor also authored the book Beyond the Vertical.

Kor received the 2009 American Alpine Club's Robert & Miriam Underhill Award for outstanding climbing achievement. Kor lived in Kingman, Arizona and continued climbing until his early 70s. He had kidney failure and prostate cancer at the time of his death.

== Notable first ascents ==
=== Colorado ===
- 1959 Diagonal, Lower East Face, Longs Peak, CO. (V 5.9 A3) with Ray Northcutt.
- 1959 T2, Redgarden Wall, Eldorado Canyon, CO. (current rating 5.11a) 1st ascent with Gerry Roach
- 1960 Yellow Spur, Redgarden Wall, Eldorado Canyon, CO. (5.9 (A1)) FA with David Dornan, Feb 21, 1960
- 1960 Long Dong Wall, Kissing Couple. FA with Harvey Carter and John Auld, May 4, 1960. (5.11a)
- 1962 Psycho, Redgarden Wall, Eldorado Canyon, CO. (III 5.9 A4) 1st ascent with Huntley Ingalls
- 1962 The Naked Edge, Redgarden Wall, Eldorado Canyon, CO. (III 5.9 A3) with Bob Culp. Entire route with Rick Horn, 1964 (5.9 A4).
- 1962 Yellow Wall, The Diamond, Longs Peak, CO. (V 5.8 A4) 2nd route on the wall, with Charles Roskosz.
- 1963 Canary Pass, Redgarden Wall, Eldorado Canyon, CO. (III 5.7 A4-) 1st ascent with Pat Ament
- 1965 Green Slab, Black Canyon of the Gunnison, CO. (VI 5.8 A4) with Brian Martz.

=== Southwest deserts ===
- 1961 Kor-Ingalls Route, Castleton Tower, Utah; FA of tower with Huntley Ingalls
- 1962 Finger of Fate, The Titan, Fisher Towers, Utah. FA of formation (V 5.8 A3) with Huntley Ingalls and George Hurley.
- 1962 Standing Rock (Monument Basin), near Moab, UT. FA of formation with Huntley Ingalls and Steve Komito.
- 1963 Kor-Dalke-Schafer IV 5.10 A1, Monster Tower, Canyonlands National Park, Utah; FA of Monster tower with Larry Dalke and Cub Schafer, 26 December 1963
- 1964 North Face III 5.9 A3(?), Argon Tower, Arches National Park, Utah; FA with Bob Bradley and Charlie Kemp, 17 January 1964

=== California ===
- 1963 West Buttress, El Capitan, Yosemite Valley, California. (VI 5.10 A3+) FA with Steve Roper.
- 1964 South Face, Washington Column, Yosemite Valley, CA. (V 5.10a A2) FA with Chris Fredericks, June 1964 .
- 1965 Gold Wall, Ribbon Falls Area, Yosemite Valley, CA. (V 5.10 A3) FA with Tom Fender, May 1965.

=== Outlying areas ===
- 1963 Robbins Route, Mount Proboscis, Logan Mountains, Northwest Territory, Canada. FA with Dick McCracken, Jim McCarthy and Royal Robbins, Aug 4-7, 1963.
- 1964 Burkett Needle, Coast Mountains, Alaska. FA with Dan Davis.

== Publications ==
- Kor, Layton; Bob Godfrey (1983). Beyond the Vertical. Boulder, CO, USA: Alpine House. pp. 21–22. ISBN 0-9611748-0-3.
- Kor, Layton (1964). "El Capitan's West Buttress". American Alpine Journal. 22 (53). New York, NY, USA: American Alpine Club: 79. ASIN B000FLCQEM.

== Bibliography ==
- Jones, Chris (1976). Climbing in North America. Berkeley, CA, USA: Published for the American Alpine Club by the University of California Press. ISBN 0-520-02976-3.
- Levin, Steve (2009). Eldorado Canyon, A Climbing Guide. Boulder CO, USA: Sharp End Publishing. ISBN 978-1-892540-65-2.
- Reid, Don; George Meyers (1993). Yosemite Climbs: Big Walls. Evergreen CO, USA: Chockstone Press. ISBN 0-934641-54-4.
