= Kissing Couple =

Sandstone pillar in Mesa County, Colorado, United States

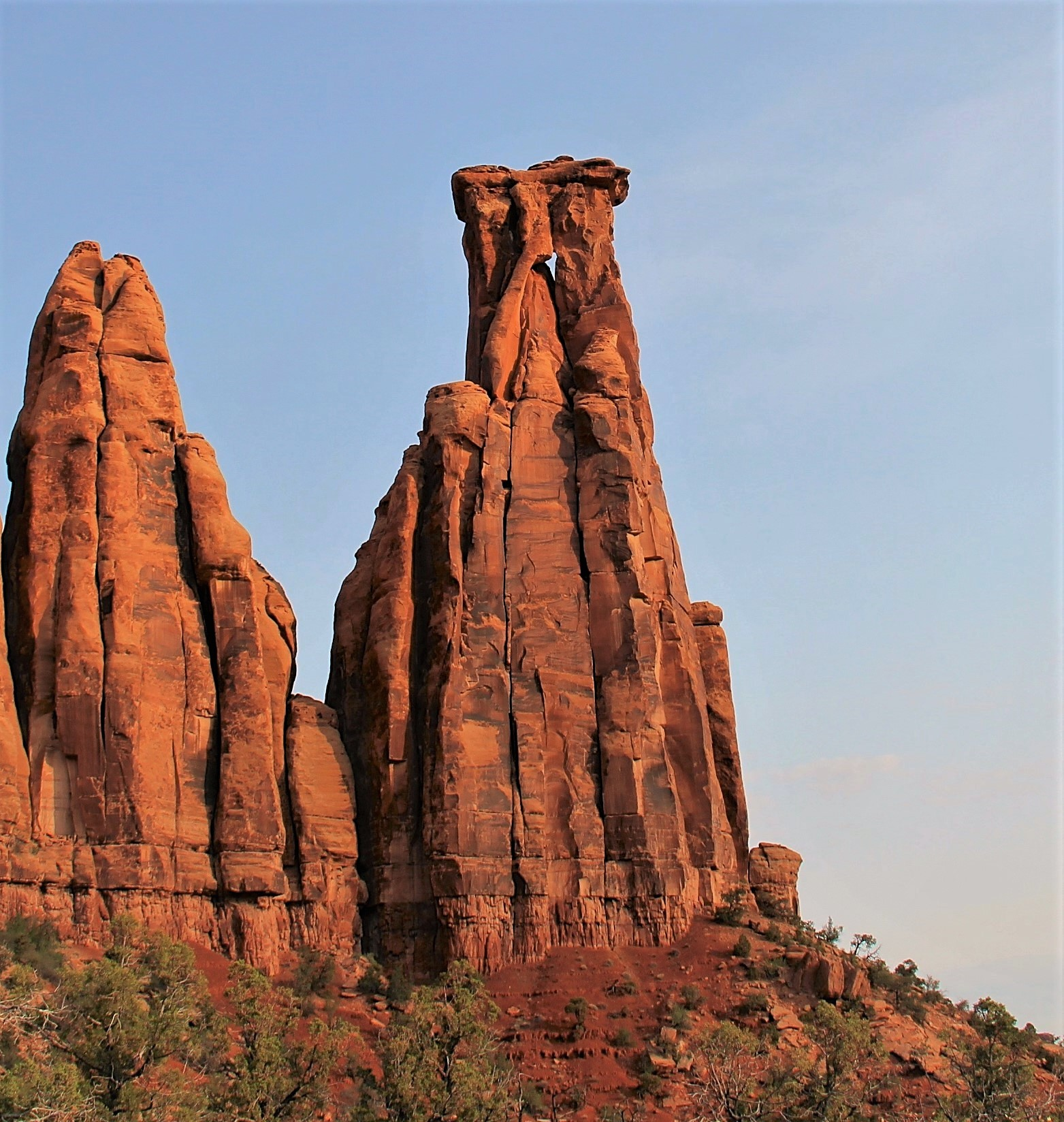
- Southeast aspect

Highest point
- Elevation: 5,815 ft (1,772 m)
- Prominence: 305 ft (93 m)
- Parent peak: Black Ridge
- Isolation: 2.28 mi (3.67 km)
- Coordinates: 39°05′21″N 108°43′05″W

Geography
- Location within Colorado Location within the United States
- Country: United States
- State: Colorado
- County: Mesa
- Protected area: Colorado National Monument
- Parent range: Colorado Plateau; Uncompahgre Plateau
- Topo map: USGS Colorado National Monument

Geology
- Rock age: Late Triassic to Early Jurassic
- Rock type: Wingate Sandstone

Climbing
- First ascent: 1960
- Easiest route: class 5.11a climbing

Kissing Couple is a 5,815-foot-elevation (1,772-meter) sandstone pillar located in Colorado National Monument, in Mesa County of western Colorado, United States. This iconic 400-foot-high tower is situated on the west side of Monument Canyon, 1.5 mile southeast of the monument's visitor center, and nine miles (14 km) west of the community of Grand Junction. It is also a half-mile south-southeast of another popular climbing destination, Independence Monument, and both can be seen from viewpoints along Rim Rock Drive. It is so named because it resembles an embracing couple. This geographical feature's name was officially adopted in 1982 by the United States Board on Geographic Names. Older USGS maps have the feature's name misplaced by about one-half mile to the southeast. The first ascent of the summit was made May 4, 1960, by Layton Kor, Harvey Carter, and John Auld via the five pitch, class 5.11a route named Long Dong Wall. The first free ascent was made in 1977 by Andy Petefish, Tom Stubbs, and Jim Pearson. Some climbers alternatively refer to Kissing Couple as "Bell Tower."

== Geology ==
This tower is the remnant of a differentially eroded fin composed primarily of cliff-forming Wingate Sandstone, which consists of wind-borne, cross-bedded quartzose sandstones deposited as ancient sand dunes approximately 200 million years ago in the Late Triassic. The thin caprock at the summit consists of fluvial sandstones of the resistant Kayenta Formation. The slope around the base of the Kissing Couple is Chinle Formation. The floor of the canyon is Precambrian basement rock consisting of gneiss, schist, and granites. The tower has a small natural arch which formed from an enlarged vertical joint. Precipitation runoff from this geographical feature drains to the Colorado River, approximately three miles to the northeast.

== Climate ==
According to the Köppen climate classification system, Kissing Couple is located in a semi-arid climate zone. Summers are hot and dry, while winters are cold with some snow. Temperatures reach 100 °F (38 °C) on 5.3 days, 90 °F (32 °C) on 57 days, and remain at or below freezing on 13 days annually. The months April through October offer the most favorable weather to visit.

== Gallery ==
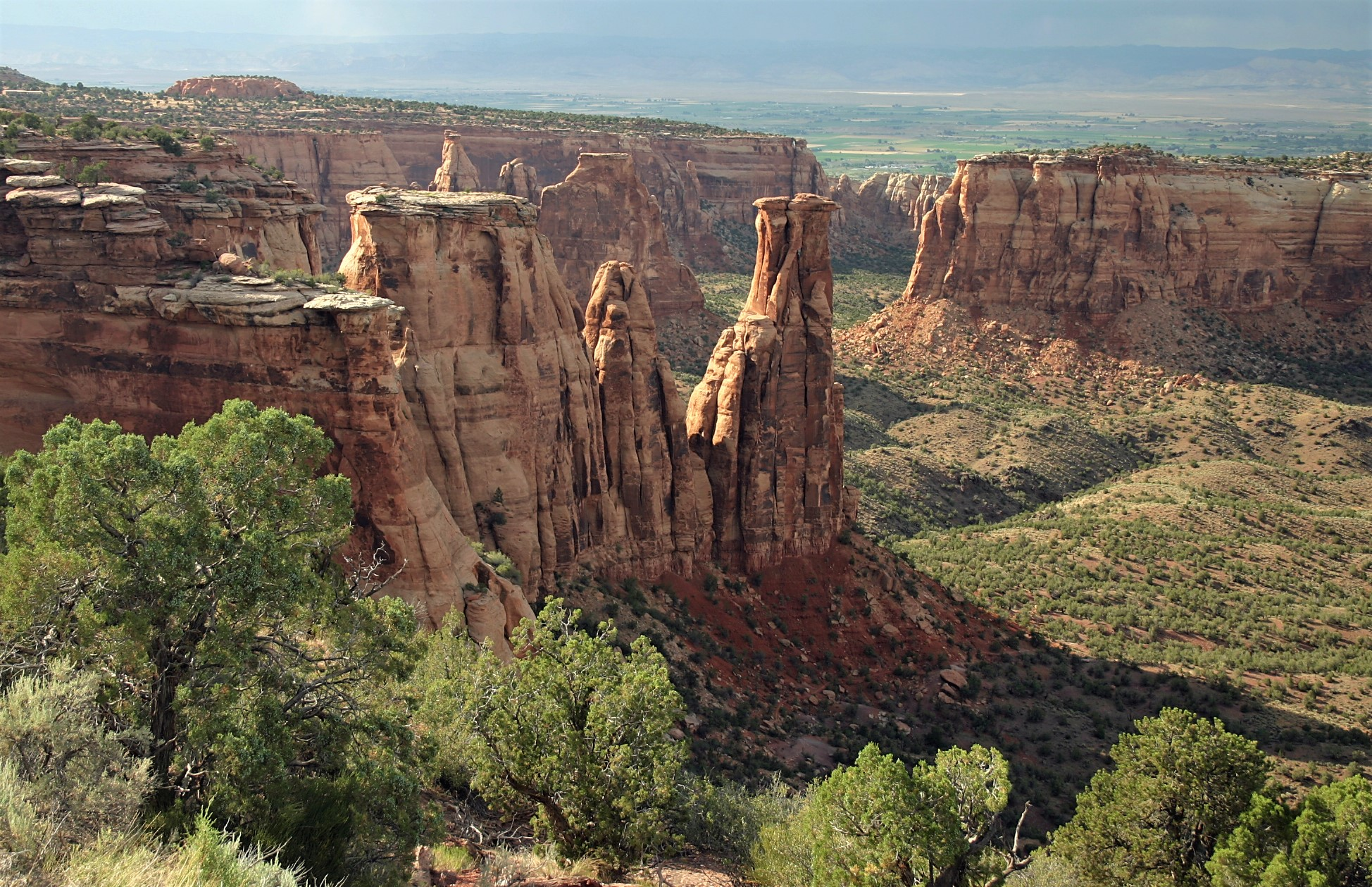
Southeast aspect from Rim Rock Drive

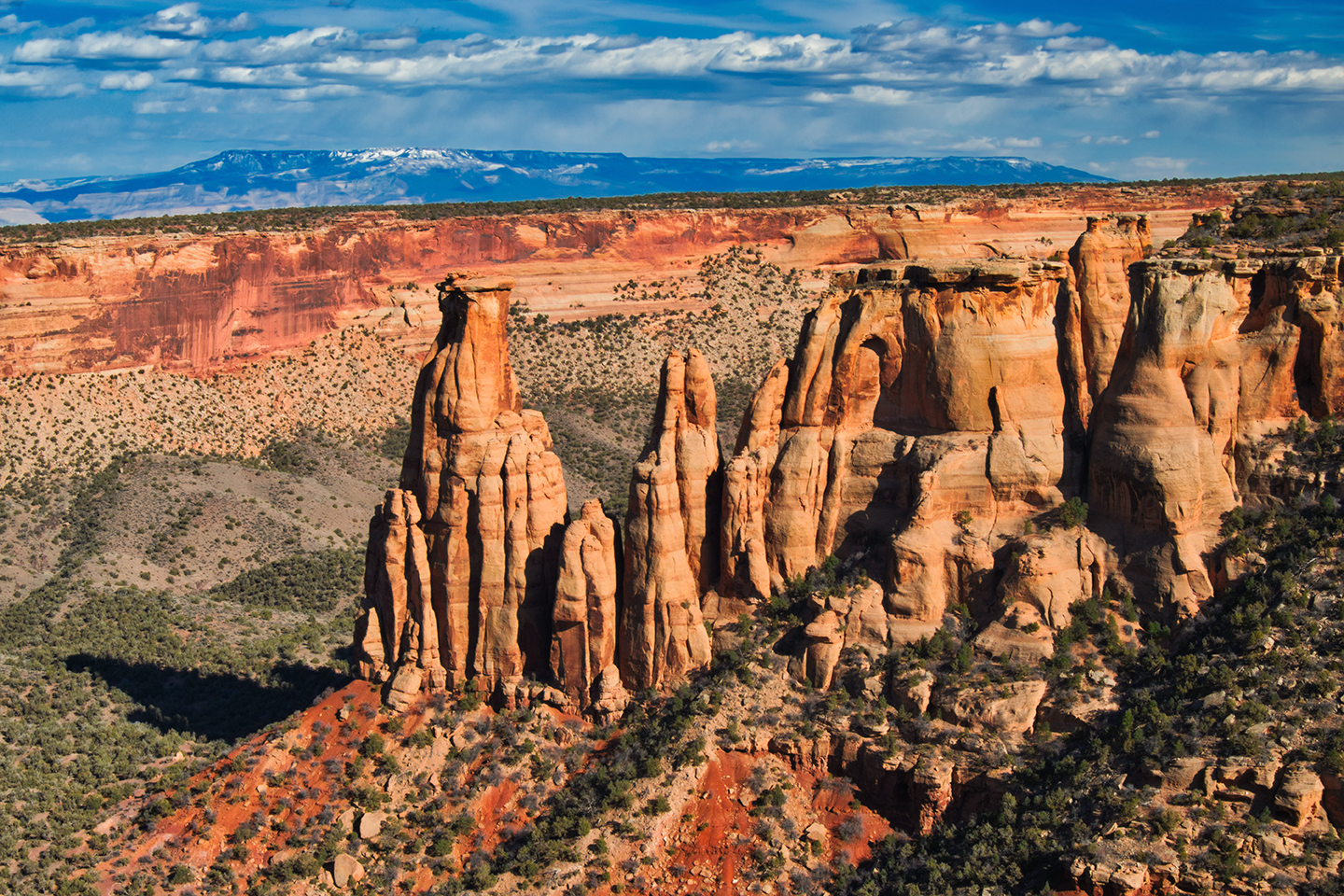
West aspect from Rim Rock Drive

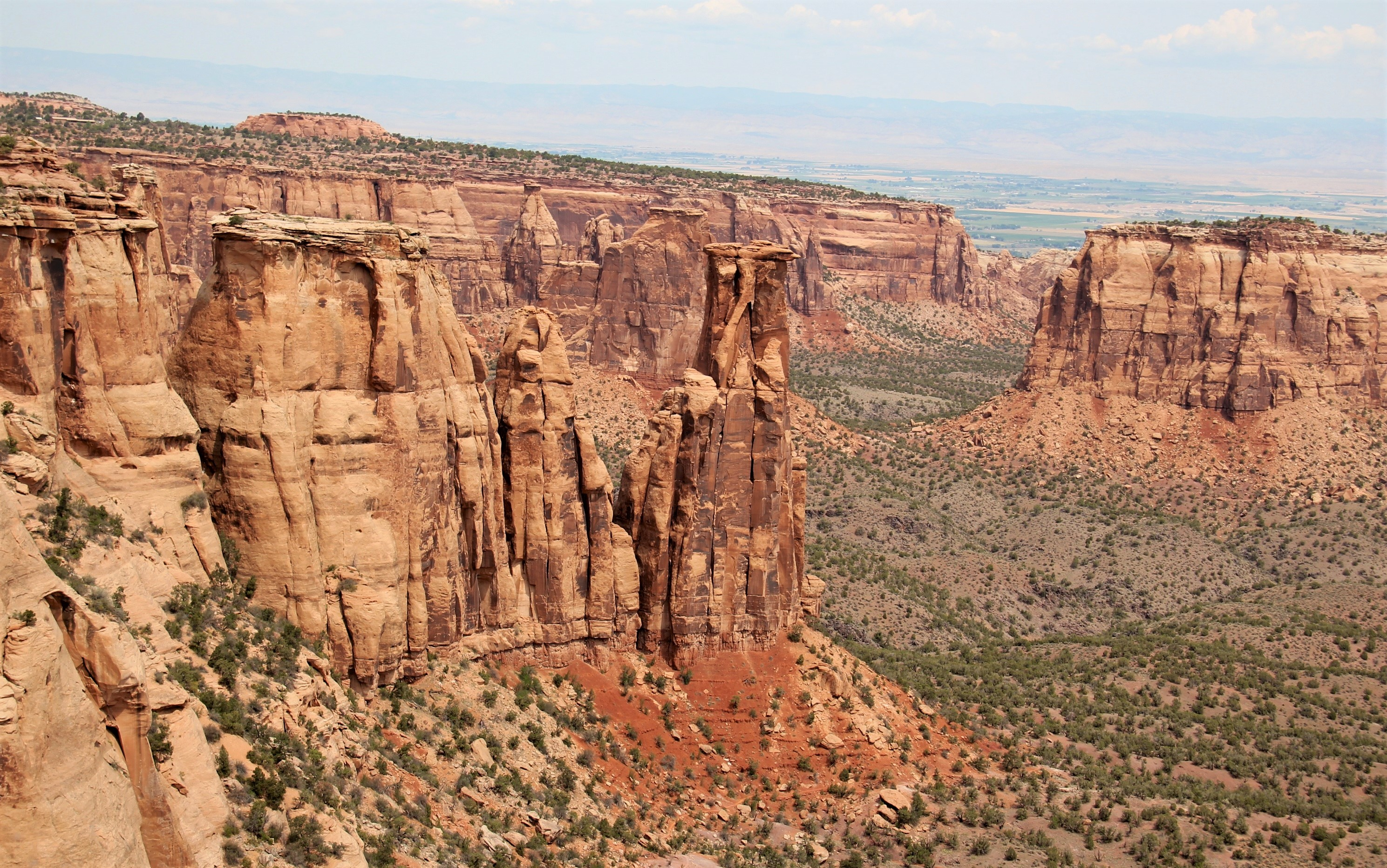

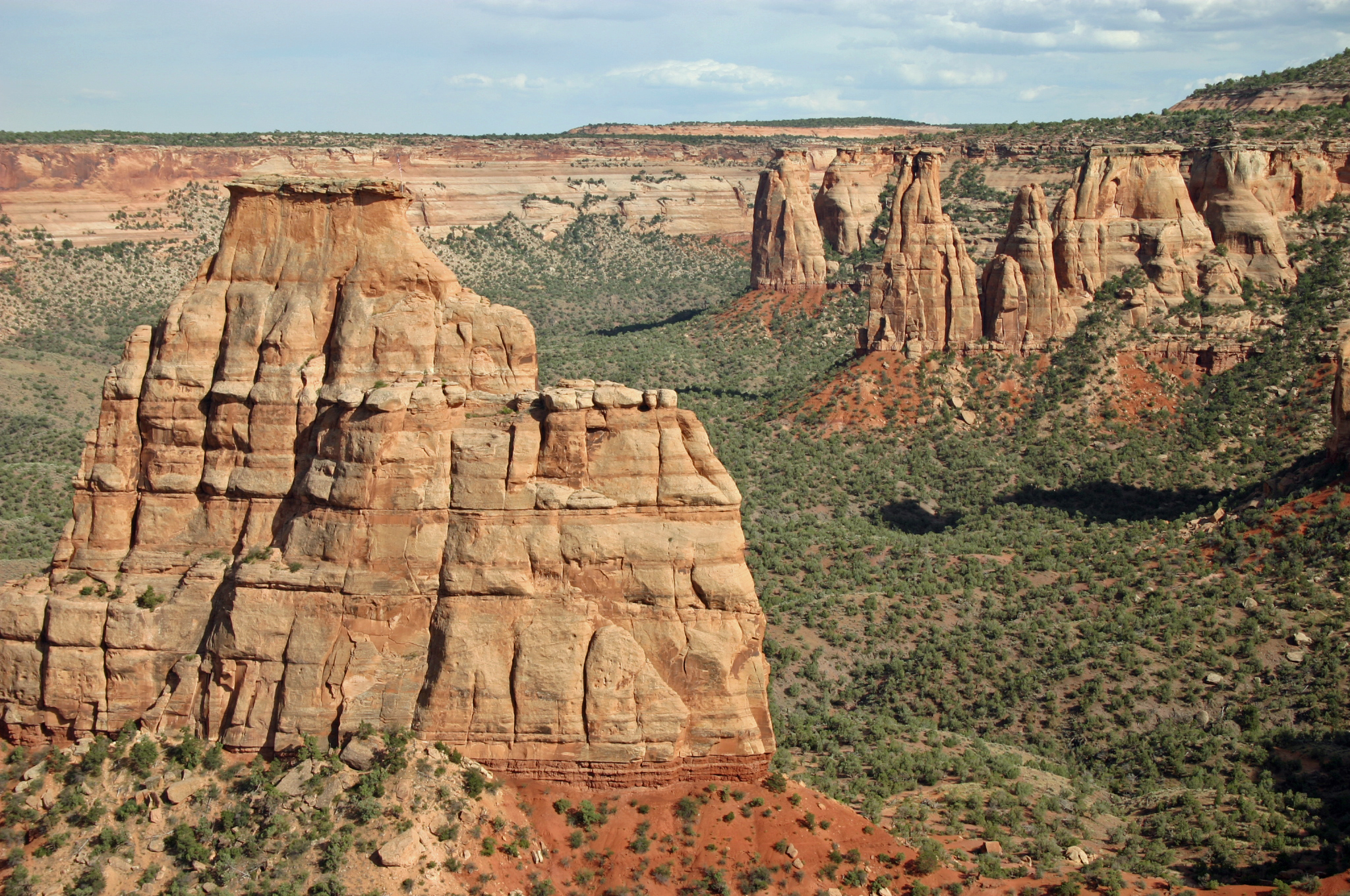
Independence Monument (left) and Kissing Couple (right)

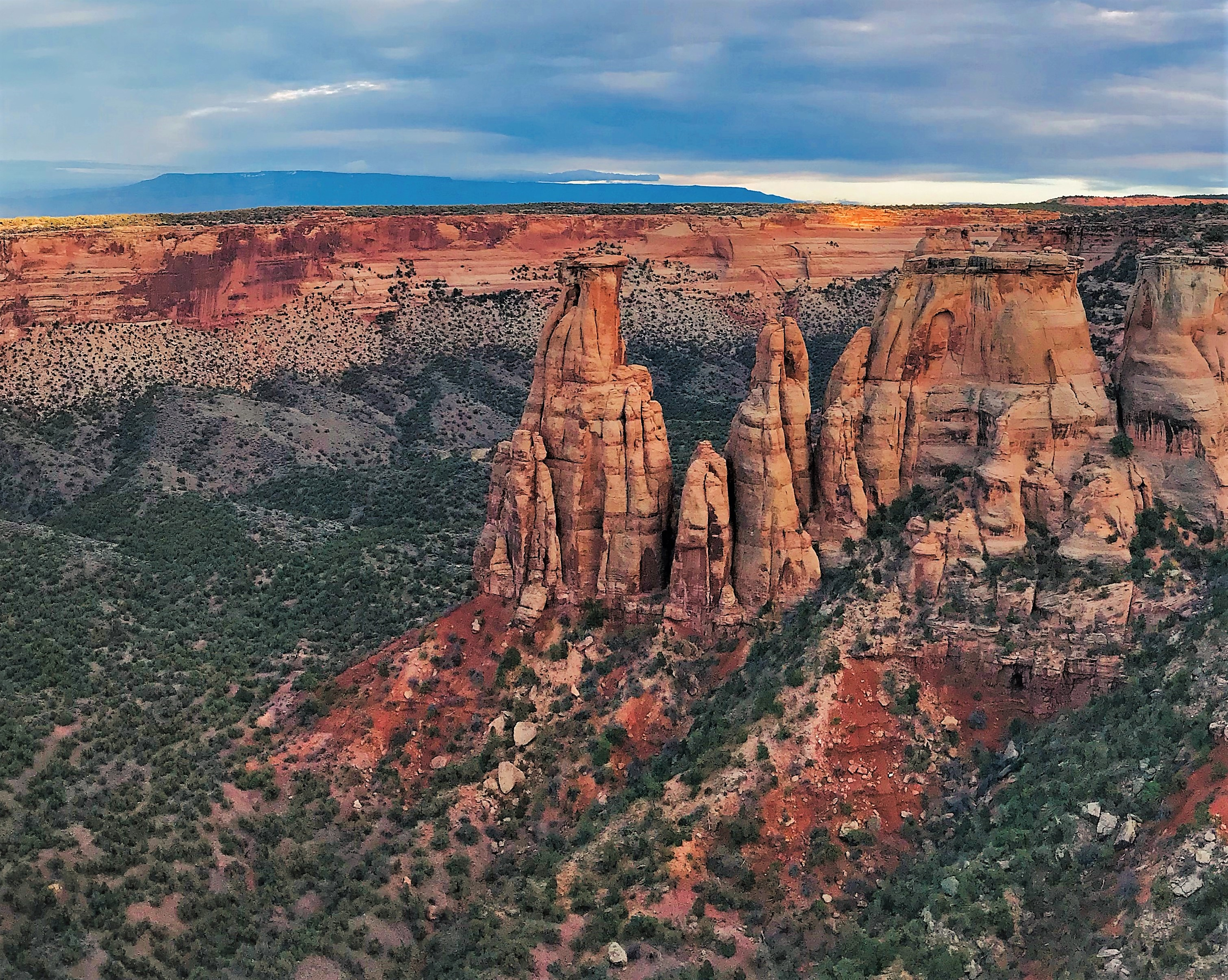

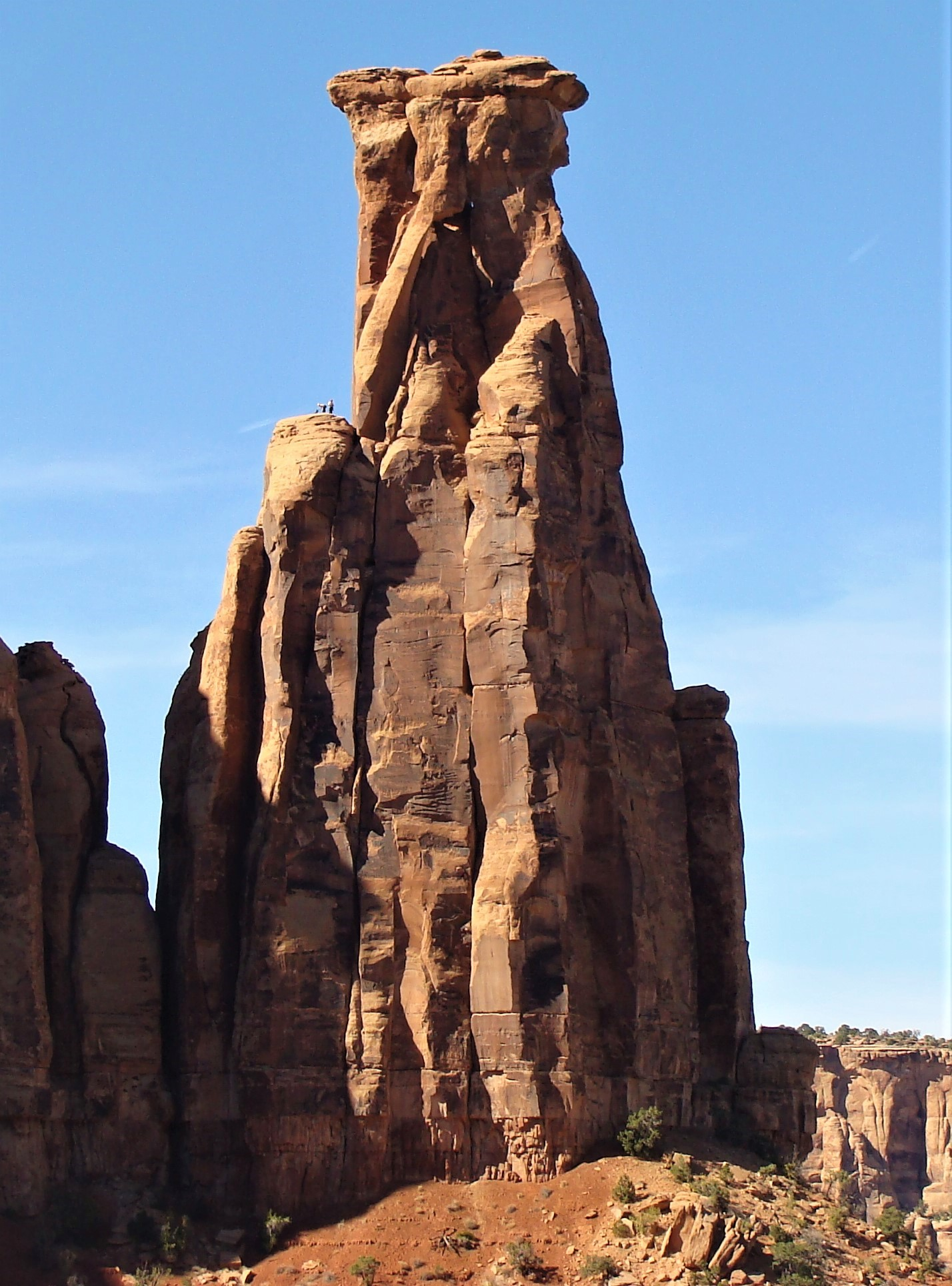
Climbers on Kissing Couple

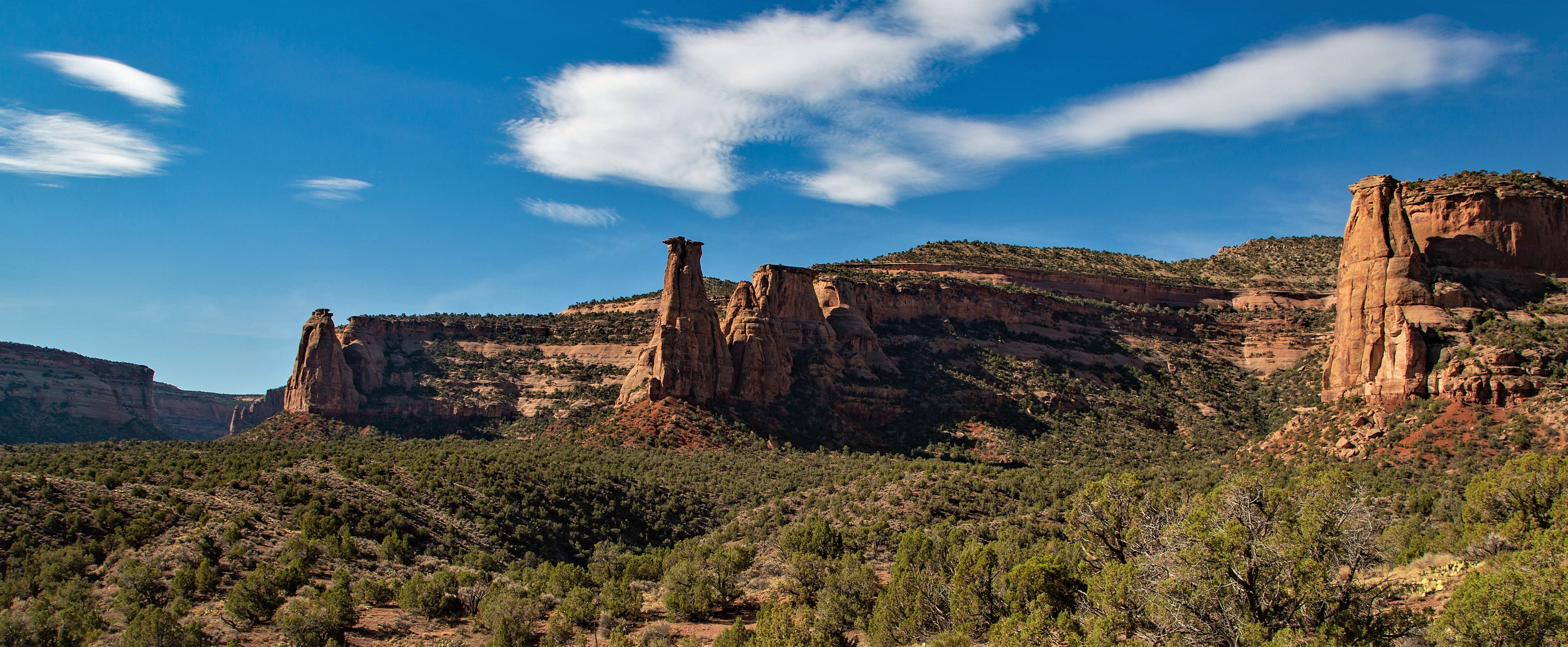
Egypt Rock (left), Kissing Couple (center), Grand View Spire (right) seen from Monument Canyon Trail

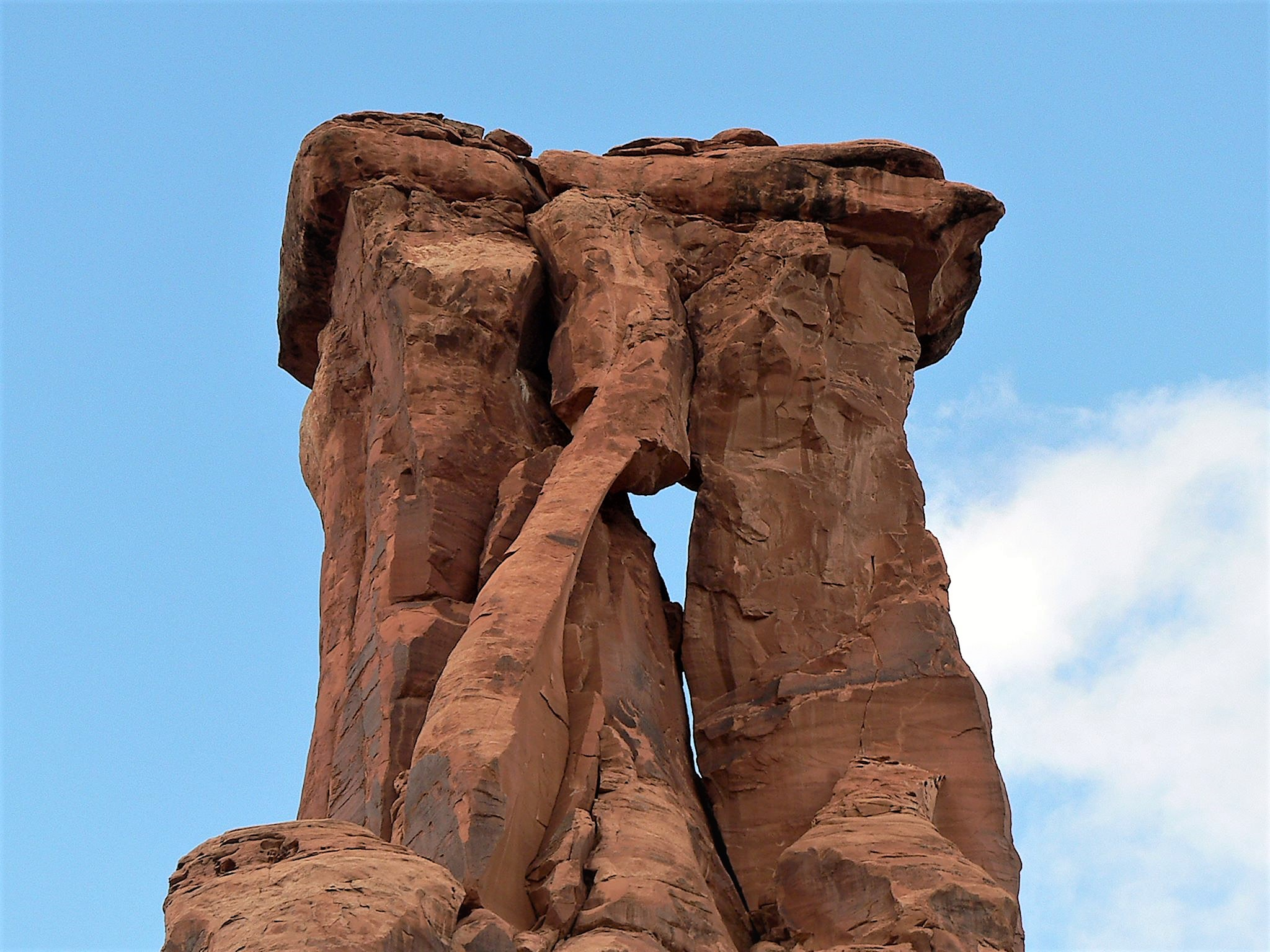
Kissing Couple detail

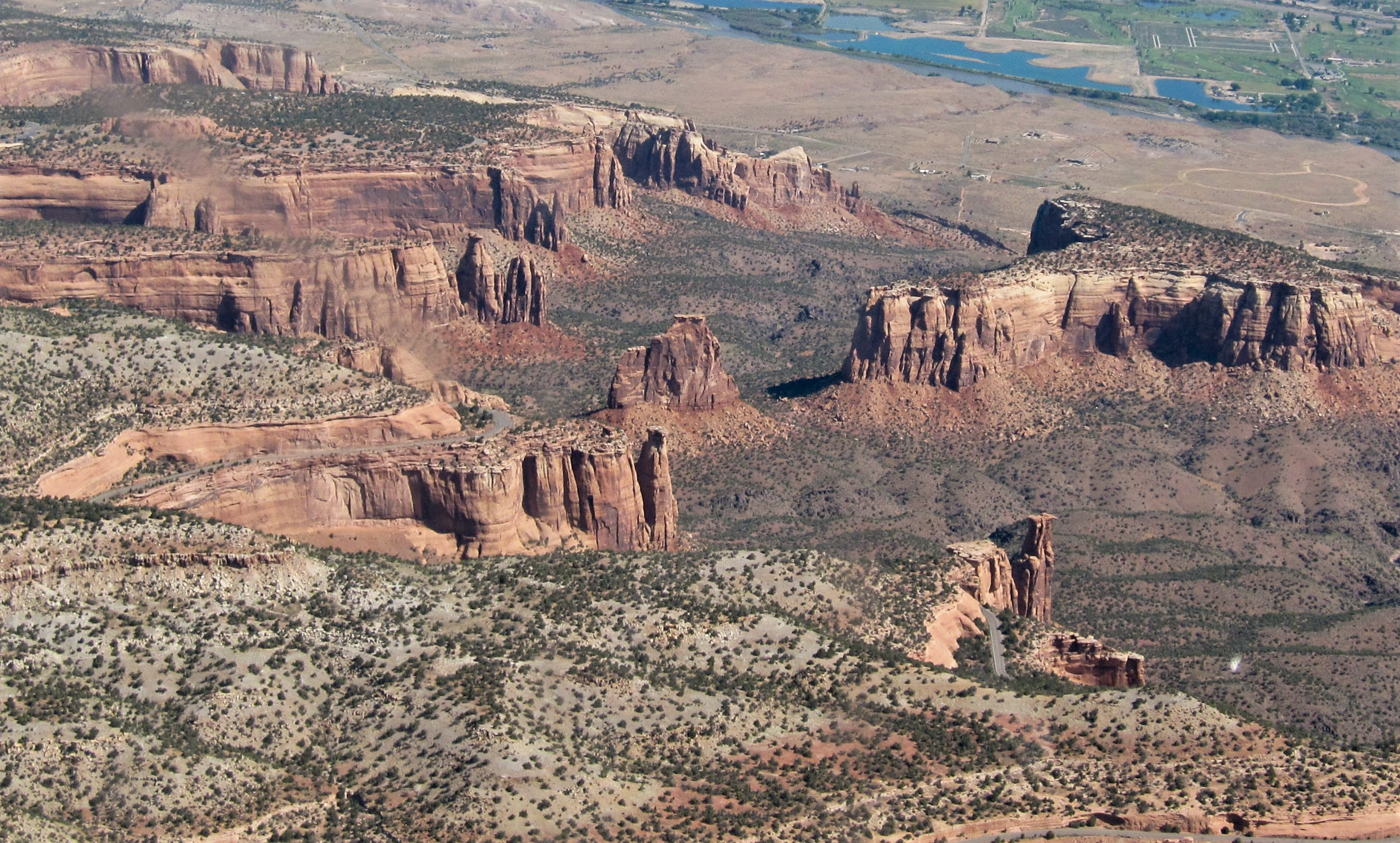
Aerial view with Kissing Couple lower right

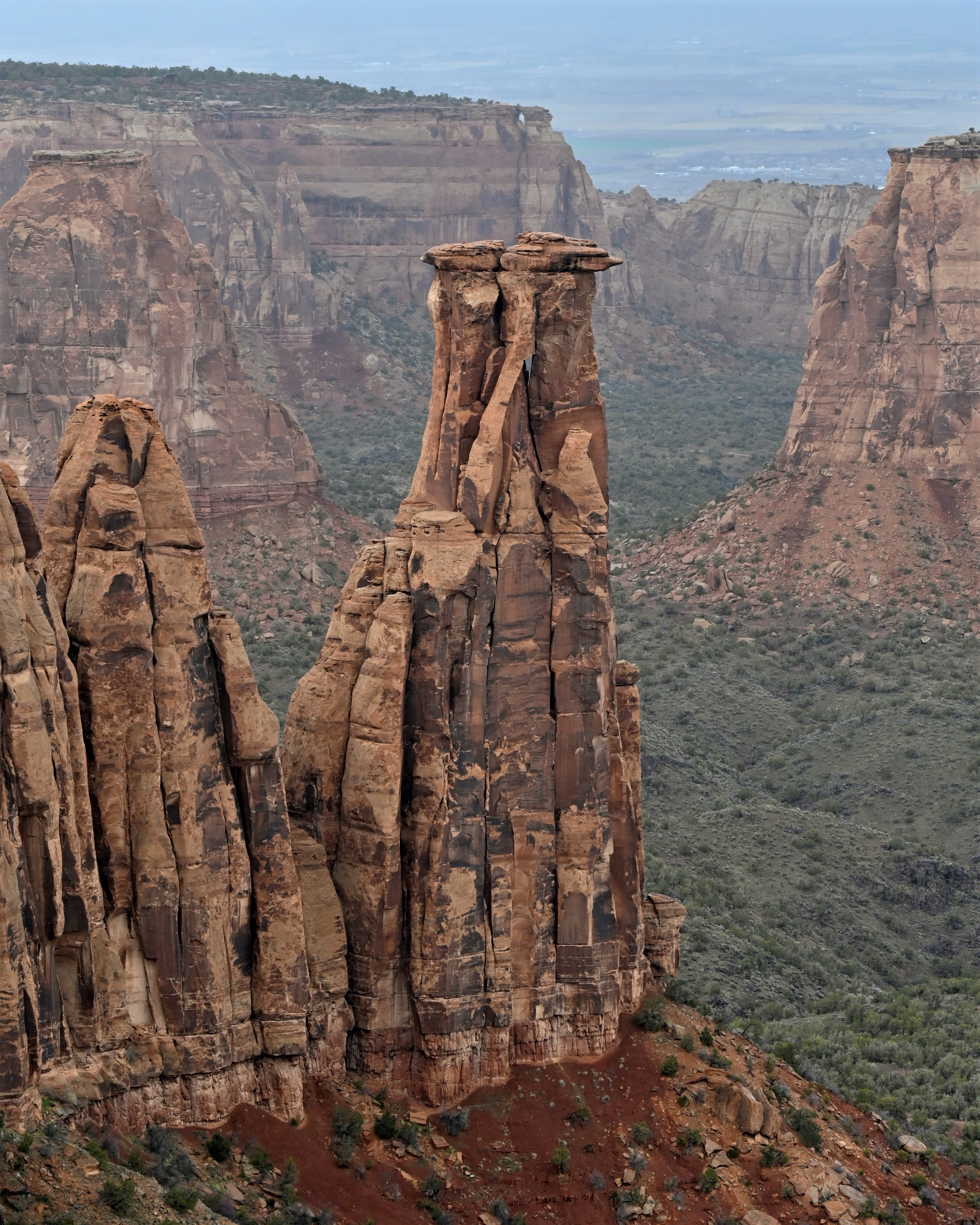

== See also ==
- List of rock formations in the United States
- Pipe Organ
- Coke Ovens
