= Pillar (landform) =

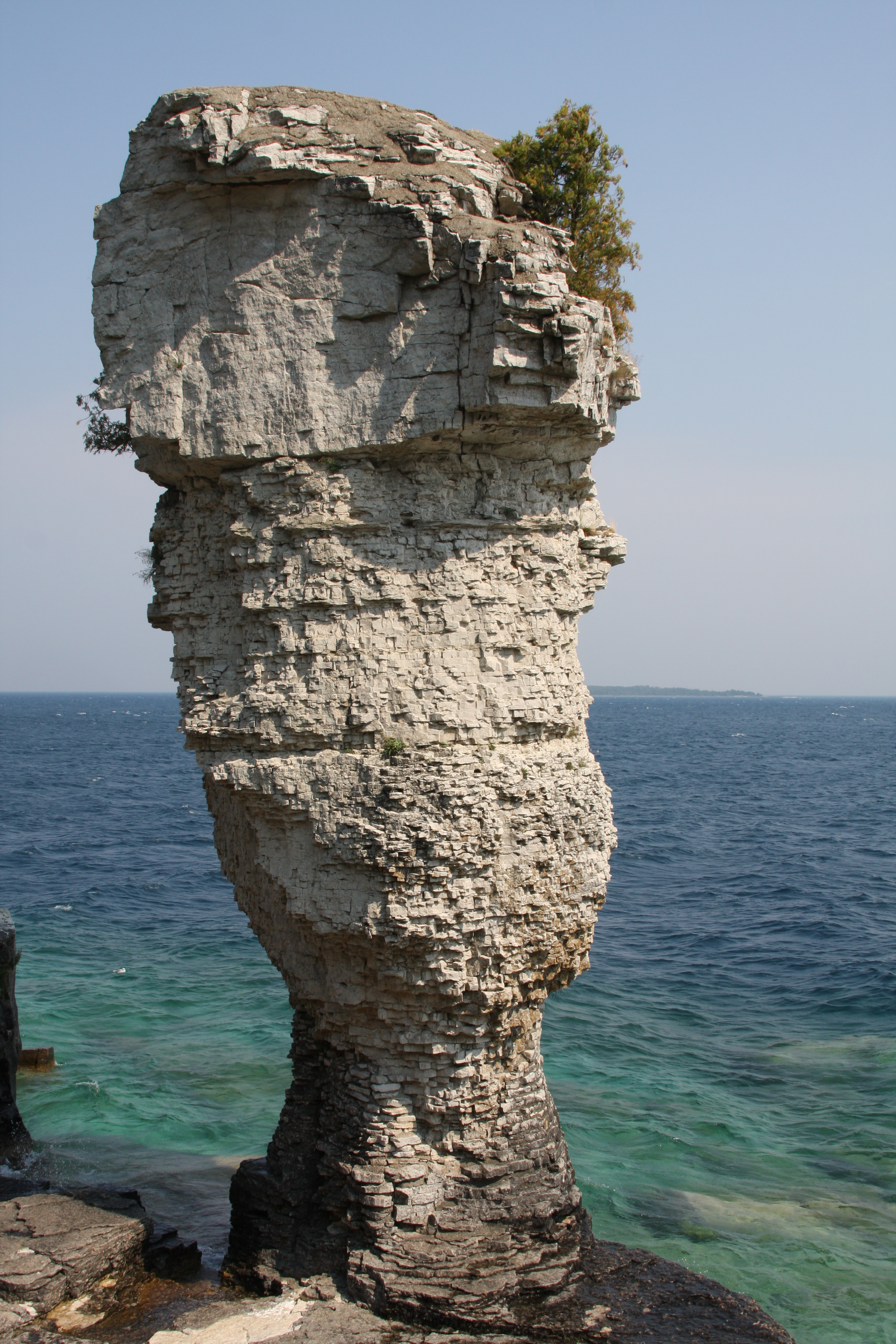
A rock pillar on Flowerpot Island, Canada

A pillar is a landform, either of rock or earth, defined by the USGS as: "Vertical, standing, often spire-shaped, natural rock formation (chimney, monument, pinnacle, pohaku, rock tower)." Some examples of rock pillars are Chambers Pillar, Katskhi Pillar, Pompeys Pillar, and Pillar Rock.

The Oxford Dictionary of Geography defines earth pillar as: "An upstanding, free column of soil that has been sheltered from erosion by a natural cap of stone on the top. They are common where boulder-rich moraines have been subject to gully erosion, as in parts of the southern Tyrol." A hoodoo is another type of earth pillar. Examples of earth pillars are Awa Sand Pillars and Đavolja Varoš.

== See also ==
- Glossary of geology
