= National Register of Historic Places listings in Colorado National Monument =

This is a list of the National Register of Historic Places listings in Colorado National Monument.

This is intended to be a complete list of the properties and districts on the National Register of Historic Places in Colorado National Monument, Colorado, United States. The locations of National Register properties and districts for which the latitude and longitude coordinates are included below, may be seen in a Google map.

There are seven properties and districts listed on the National Register in the park.

This National Park Service list is complete through NPS recent listings posted March 21, 2025.

== Current listings ==
	Name on the Register	Image	Date listed	Location	City or town	Description
1	Colorado National Monument Visitor Center Complex	Colorado National Monument Visitor Center Complex	July 15, 2003 (#03000647)	Colorado National Monument; 39°06′07″N 108°43′50″W	Fruita	
2	Devils Kitchen Picnic Shelter	Devils Kitchen Picnic Shelter	April 21, 1994 (#94000309)	Colorado National Monument; 39°01′58″N 108°37′59″W	Grand Junction	
3	Rim Rock Drive Historic District	Rim Rock Drive Historic District	April 21, 1994 (#94000310)	Colorado National Monument; 39°03′25″N 108°42′04″W	Grand Junction	
4	Saddlehorn Caretaker's House and Garage	Saddlehorn Caretaker's House and Garage	April 21, 1994 (#94000306)	Colorado National Monument; 39°06′05″N 108°43′59″W	Grand Junction	
5	Saddlehorn Comfort Station	Saddlehorn Comfort Station	April 21, 1994 (#94000305)	Colorado National Monument; 39°06′17″N 108°44′23″W	Grand Junction	
6	Saddlehorn Utility Area Historic District	Saddlehorn Utility Area Historic District	April 21, 1994 (#94000308)	Colorado National Monument; 39°06′05″N 108°44′17″W	Grand Junction	
7	Serpents Trail	Serpents Trail	April 21, 1994 (#94000307)	Colorado National Monument; 39°01′53″N 108°38′11″W	Grand Junction	

== See also ==
- National Register of Historic Places listings in Mesa County, Colorado
- National Register of Historic Places listings in Colorado
