= Cisco (disambiguation) =

Cisco is an American technology conglomerate.

Cisco may also refer to:

== Places ==
- Siska, British Columbia, also known historically as Cisco

=== United States ===
- Cisco, California, a small town
- Cisco, Georgia, an unincorporated community
- Cisco, Illinois, a village
- Cisco, Kentucky, an unincorporated community
- Cisco, Minnesota, a former unincorporated community
- Lisco, Nebraska, a small town in western Nebraska, erroneously called "Cisco" by the United States Census Bureau in 2000
- Cisco, Texas, a city
- Cisco Group, a geologic group in Texas
- Cisco, Utah, a ghost town
- Cisco Oil Field, Utah
- Cisco, West Virginia, an unincorporated community

== Companies ==
- Certis CISCO, corporatised entity of the former Commercial and Industrial Security Corporation in Singapore
- Cisco Brewers, a brewery, distillery and winery on Nantucket Island in Massachusetts, US
- Nissin Cisco Co. Ltd, a Japanese cereal and snack-food manufacturer, subsidiary of Nissin Foods
- Luzon Cisco Transport, Inc., a bus company which become part of Five Star Bus Company

== Other uses ==
- Cisco (name), a given name, nickname or surname (and a list of people with the name)
- El Cisco a 1966 spaghetti western directed by Sergio Bergonzelli
- Cisco (fish), certain Eurasian and North American salmonid freshwater whitefish in the genus Coregonus
- Cisco (Grand Theft Auto Advance), a character from Grand Theft Auto Advance
- USS Cisco (SS-290), World War II submarine
- Don Cisco or Cisco, Mexican-American rapper and producer
- Cisco College, a community college in Cisco, Texas, US
- Cisco Field, a proposed baseball stadium for the Oakland Athletics in California, US
- Cisco High School (Texas)
- Cisco (wine), a brand of low-end fortified wine
- Cisco, an original composition performed on Pat Martino's 1967 album El_Hombre

== See also ==
- The Cisco Kid, created by O. Henry
- Crisco, a brand of shortening
- Frisco (disambiguation)
- Sisko (disambiguation)
- Sisqó (born 1978), R&B singer
- Sysco, a foodservice distributor
- CSIRO (Commonwealth Scientific and Industrial Research Organisation)
- Gene Siskel, American film critic and journalist
