= Cisco (name) =

Cisco is a given name, nickname, and surname. The name is derived from Francisco. It may refer to:

== People with the given name ==
- Cisco Adler (born 1978), American rock musician
- Cisco McSorley (born 1950), American politician
- Cisco Everville

== People with the nickname ==
- Francisco Cisco Carlos (born 1940), retired Major League Baseball pitcher
- Gilbert Cisco Houston (1918–1961), American folk singer associated with Woody Guthrie
- Israel Cisco Oliver (born 1947), American retired Philippine Basketball Association player

== People with the surname ==
- Andre Cisco (born 2000), American football player
- Galen Cisco (born 1936), American baseball player
- Jay Guy Cisco (1844–1922), American Confederate veteran, journalist, diplomat and businessman
- Michael Cisco (born 1970), American writer

== See also ==
- Cisco (disambiguation)
- Sisko (disambiguation)
