= Terra Tower =

Sandstone pillar in Colorado National Monument, United States

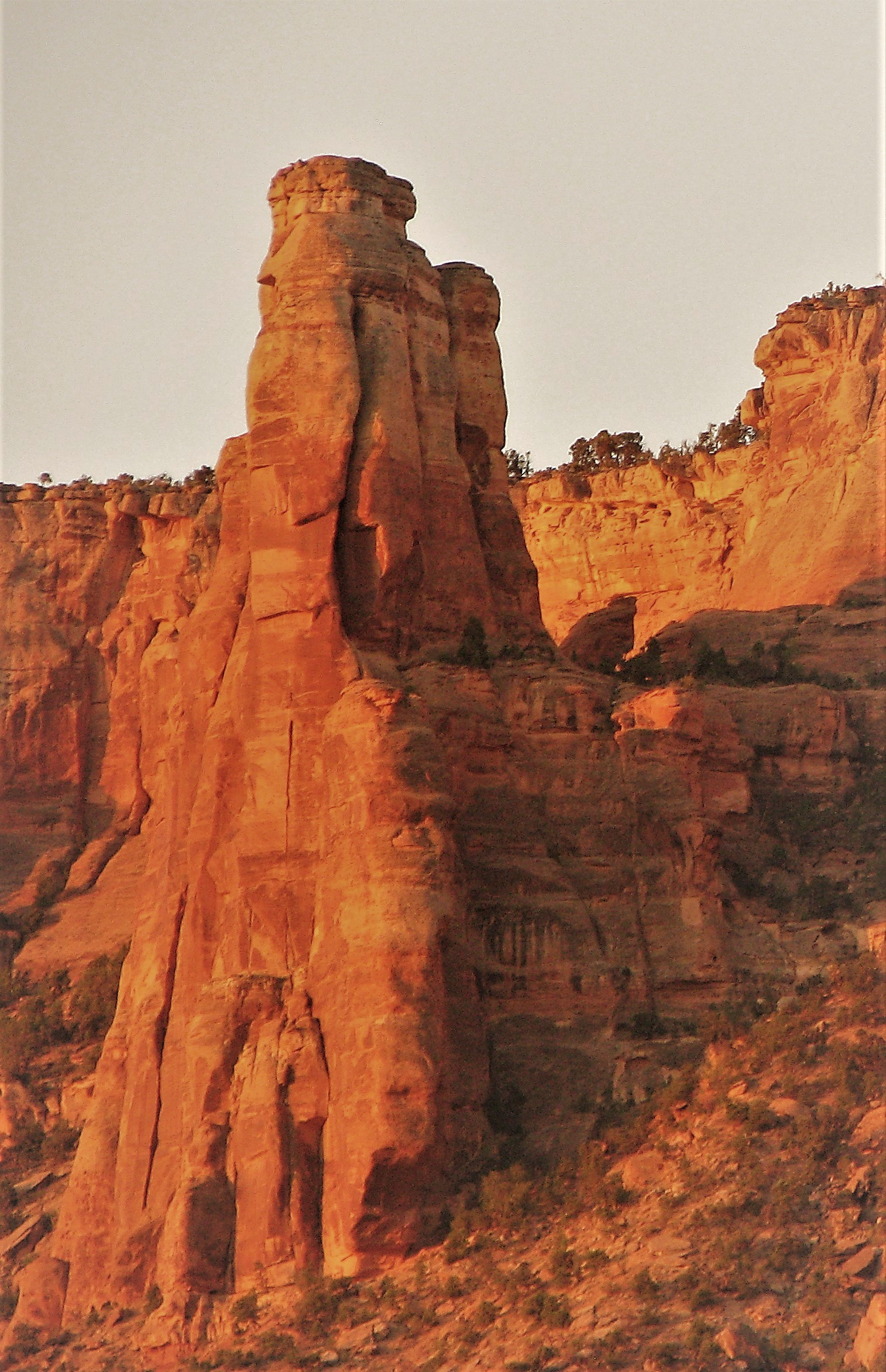
- Northeast aspect

Highest point
- Elevation: 5,790 ft (1,760 m)
- Prominence: 60 ft (18 m)
- Parent peak: Black Ridge
- Isolation: 3.76 mi (6.05 km)
- Coordinates: 39°04′12″N 108°40′40″W

Geography
- Location within Colorado Location within the United States
- Country: United States
- State: Colorado
- County: Mesa
- Protected area: Colorado National Monument
- Parent range: Colorado Plateau; Uncompahgre Plateau
- Topo map: USGS Colorado National Monument

Geology
- Rock age: Late Triassic to Early Jurassic
- Rock type: Wingate Sandstone

Climbing
- First ascent: 1979
- Easiest route: class 5.11 climbing

Terra Tower is a 5,790-foot-elevation (1,760-meter) sandstone pillar located in Colorado National Monument, in Mesa County of western Colorado, United States. This 350-foot-high tower is situated on the Redlands escarpment, approximately seven miles west of the community of Grand Junction. Topographic relief is significant as it rises 1,000 feet (300 meters) above the Tiara Rado Golf Course in approximately one-half mile. The first ascent of the summit was made in 1979 by Harvey Carter and Tom Merrill via the class 5.11 route, Way Bazaar.

== Geology ==
This tower is the remnant of a differentially eroded fin composed primarily of cliff-forming Wingate Sandstone, which consists of wind-borne, cross-bedded quartzose sandstones deposited as ancient sand dunes approximately 200 million years ago in the Late Triassic. The caprock at the summit consists of fluvial sandstones of the resistant Kayenta Formation. The slope around the base of Terra Tower is Chinle Formation. Precipitation runoff from this geographical feature drains to the Colorado River, approximately two miles to the northeast.

== Climate ==
According to the Köppen climate classification system, Terra Tower is located in a semi-arid climate zone. Summers are hot and dry, while winters are cold with some snow. Temperatures reach 100 °F (38 °C) on 5.3 days, 90 °F (32 °C) on 57 days, and remain at or below freezing on 13 days annually. April through October offer the most favorable weather to visit.

== Climbing ==
Established rock climbing routes on Terra Tower:

- Way Bazaar – class 5.11 First ascent 1979
- Tom Stubbs Memorial Route – class 5.11 – 4 pitches – FA 2012 – James Stover, Doug McKee

== Gallery ==
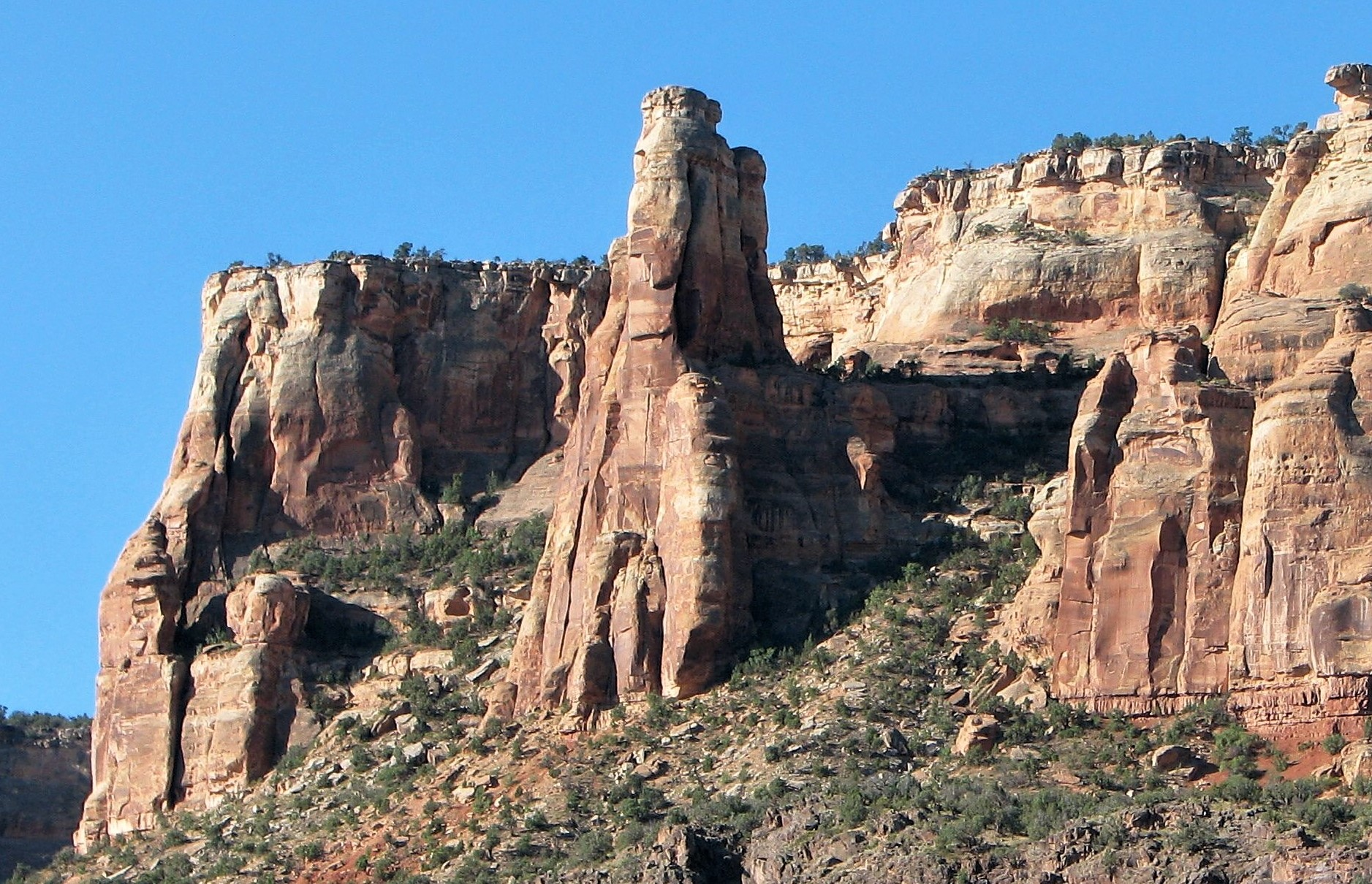

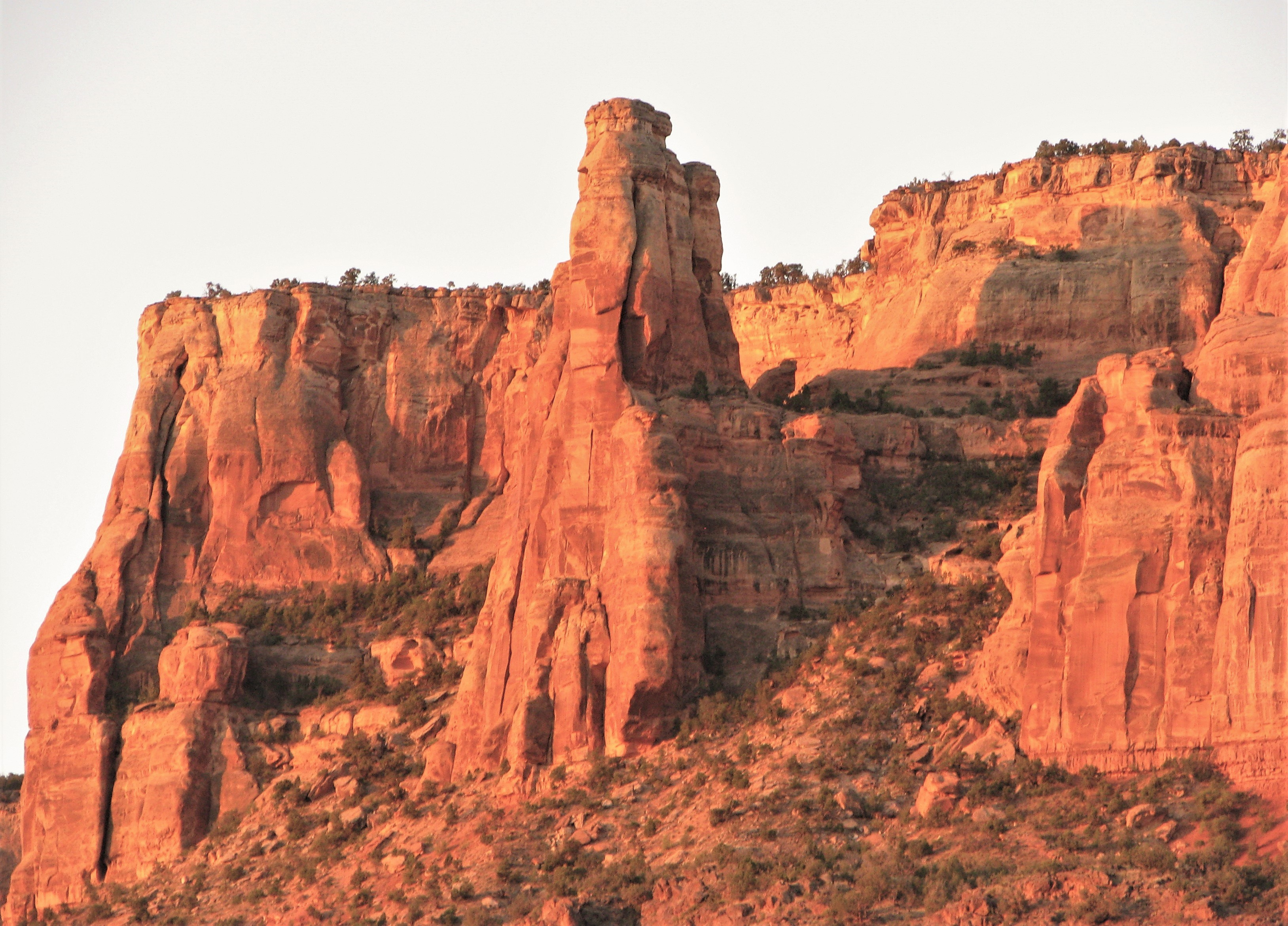

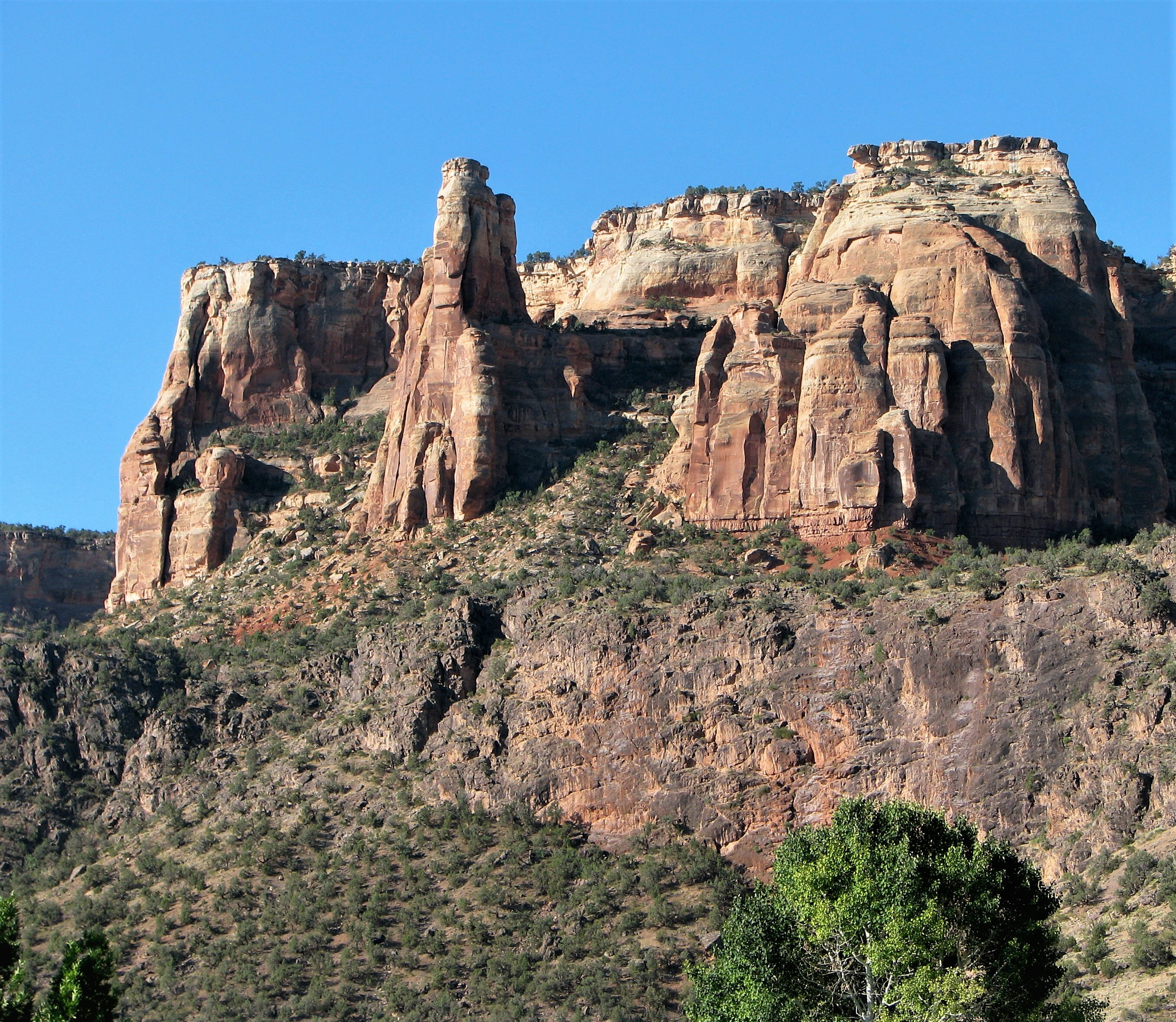

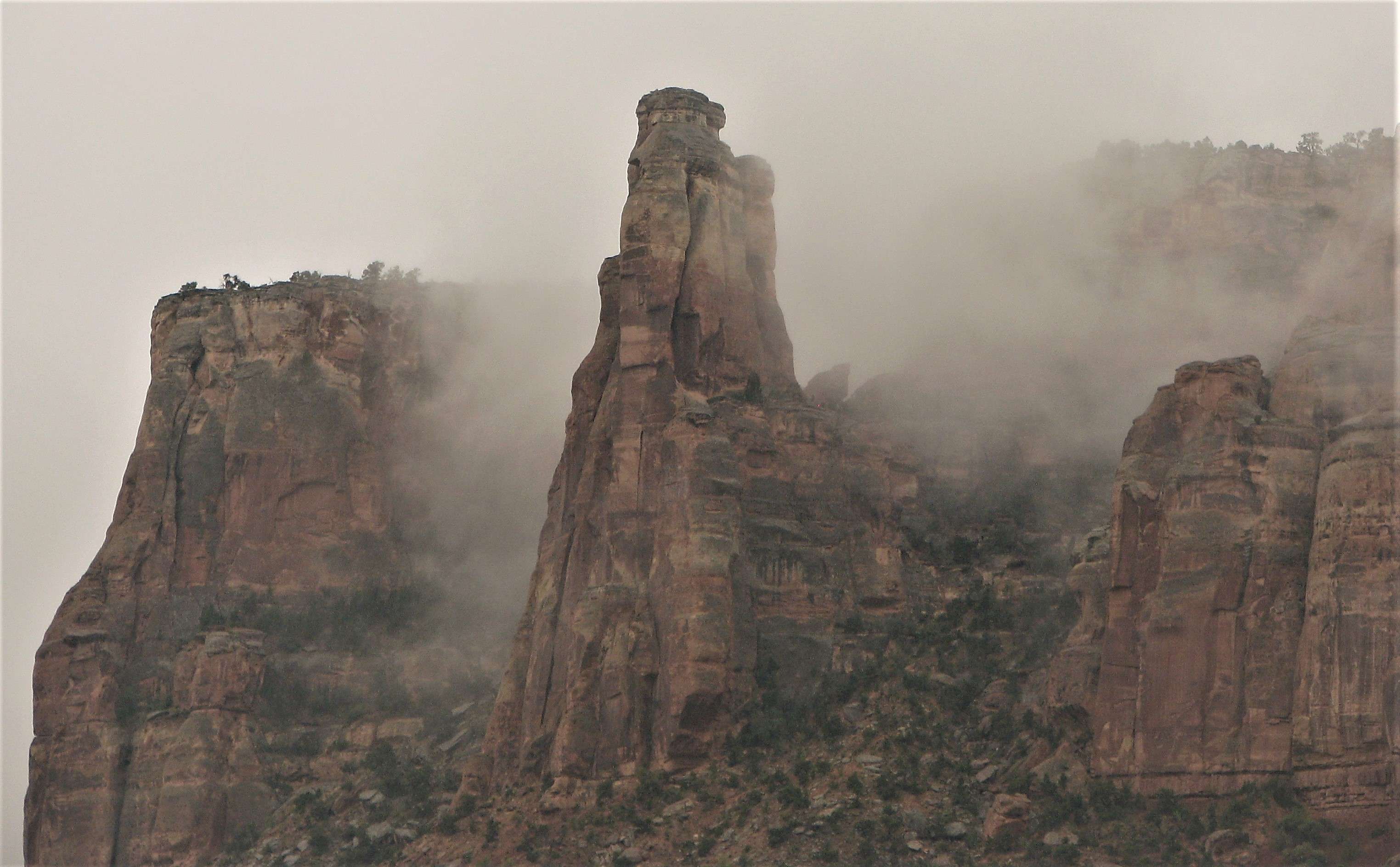

== See also ==
- List of rock formations in the United States
