= Westwater Canyon =

Land feature in Utah

- Canyon
- Westwater Canyon

- Location within Utah
- Coordinates: 38°58′20″N 109°13′40″W
- Location: Eastern Utah/Colorado border

Westwater Canyon is a canyon located on the Colorado River in Eastern Utah between the Utah/Colorado state line and Cisco, Utah. The inner gorge of the canyon is made up of black Precambrian rock and contains class III and IV rapids which are sought after by whitewater enthusiasts. The most notable rapid, called "Skull", is the most significant.

The Bureau of Land Management (BLM) oversees a permitting system for whitewater travelers for this section of the Colorado River, and boaters must follow special rules and regulations. Many boaters pack camping equipment in on rafts and make the 17-mile (27 km) trip from Westwater ranger station to Cisco landing over 1–2 days.

Westwater Canyon runs through a wilderness study area and has been proposed for designation as a wild and scenic river along with Ruby Canyon just upstream.

The Westwater Ranger Station put-in to the Rose Ranch takeout is a 17-mile journey. Most whitewater is compacted in the Marble gorge where rescue of swimmers and recovery of capsized vessels is limited by vertical canyon walls.

== Geology ==
The geology of Westwater Canyon is very similar to nearby National Parks and Monuments such as Canyonlands National Park, Colorado National Monument, and Arches National Park. The uppermost rocks in the canyon date from the Triassic-Jurassic periods and are composed of the reddish, cliff-forming Wingate Sandstone atop the green to purple, slope-forming Chinle Formation. Within the inner gorge of Westwater, a large unconformity separates the Chinle Formation from the Precambrian basement rocks composed of metamorphic Vishnu Schist (black) and Zoroaster Granite (pink). Westwater Canyon and Ruby Canyon are the only places on the Colorado River outside of the Grand Canyon where Precambrian rocks are exposed.
