= Serpents Trail =

- U.S. National Register of Historic Places
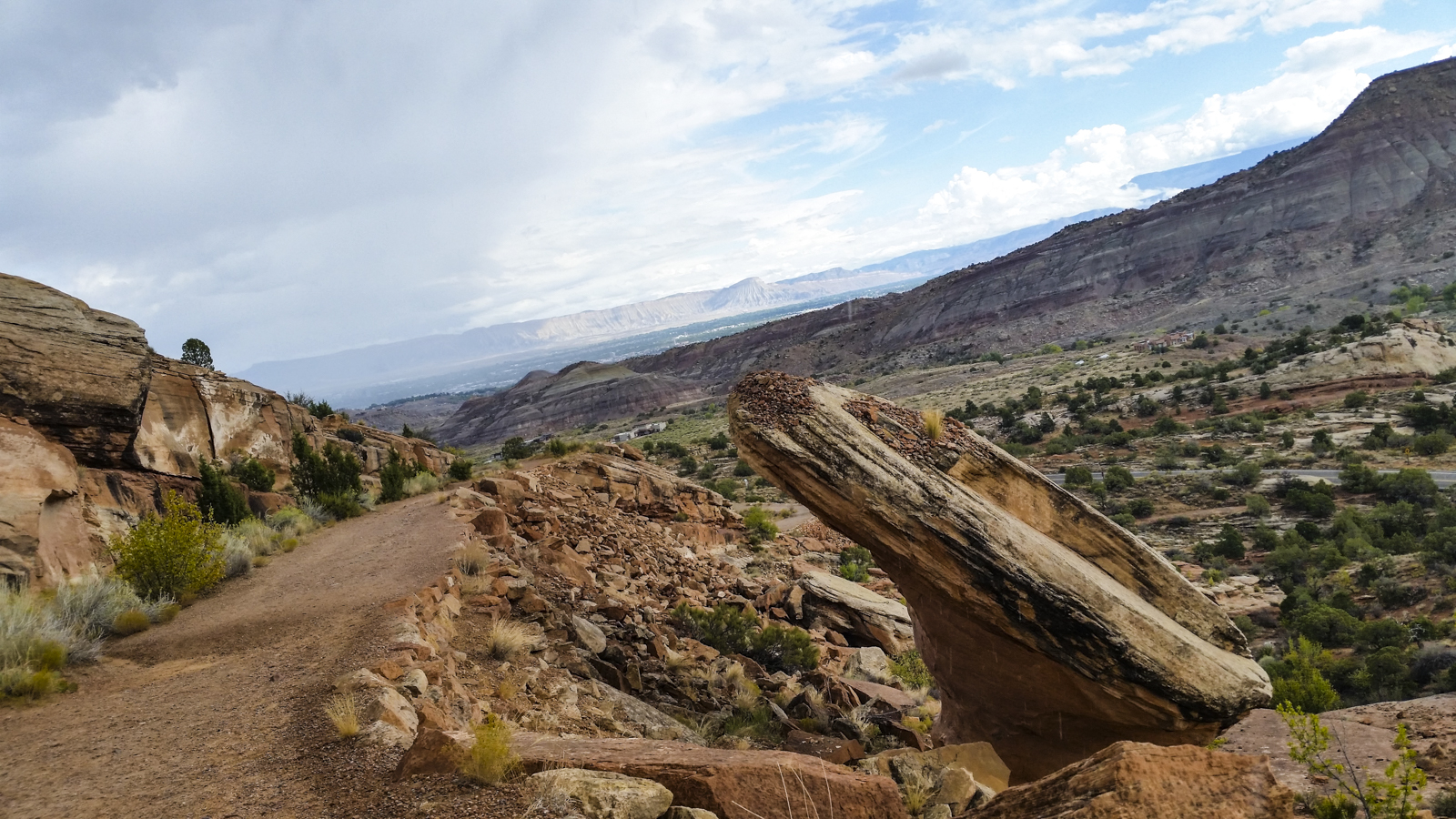
- Serpents Trail, September 2017

- Location within Colorado Location within the United States
- Nearest city: Grand Junction, Colorado
- Coordinates: 39°1′53″N 108°38′11″W
- Built: 1921
- Architect: John Otto, J. B. Claybaugh
- MPS: Colorado National Monument MPS
- NRHP reference No.: 94000307
- Added to NRHP: April 21, 1994

The Serpents Trail, also known as the Trail of the Serpents and the Serpentine Trail, is a trail within the Colorado National Monument in Mesa County, Colorado, United States, that is listed on the National Register of Historic Places.

== Description ==
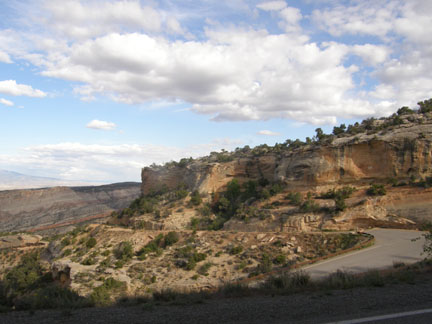
Serpents Trail, unknown date

The trail was built by the visionary John Otto, who began the campaign to establish the national monument. The trail was, in fact, a road from Grand Junction through No Thoroughfare Canyon to the rimrock near Cold Shivers Point, with an elevation gain of nearly 1,100 feet (340 m) over 2.5 miles (4.0 km). From Cold Shivers Point the road proceeded at a gentler grade for 4 miles (6.4 km) to Glade Park. Otto began his survey in 1911 with the help of civil engineer J.F. Sleeper. Otto's grand plan was to link Grand Junction to Moab, Utah by a scenic road to be part of a transcontinental road system. Construction began in 1912 and continued sporadically to 1921, when Mesa County took the project over. Engineer J.B. Claybaugh completed the project in 1924.

The construction of the Rim Rock Drive destroyed portions of the Serpents Trail. A 1.6-mile (2.6 km) portion has been preserved as a hiking trail. During the 1930s the Park Service considered upgrading the trail to a higher standard of road, but dropped the project. Only the relatively gentle upper section of the trail was incorporated into Rim Rock Drive in 1939–40.

The trail was added to the National Register of Historic Places April 21, 1994

== See also ==
- National Register of Historic Places listings in Colorado National Monument
- National Register of Historic Places listings in Mesa County, Colorado
