= Coke Ovens (Colorado National Monument) =

Set of pillars in Colorado, United States

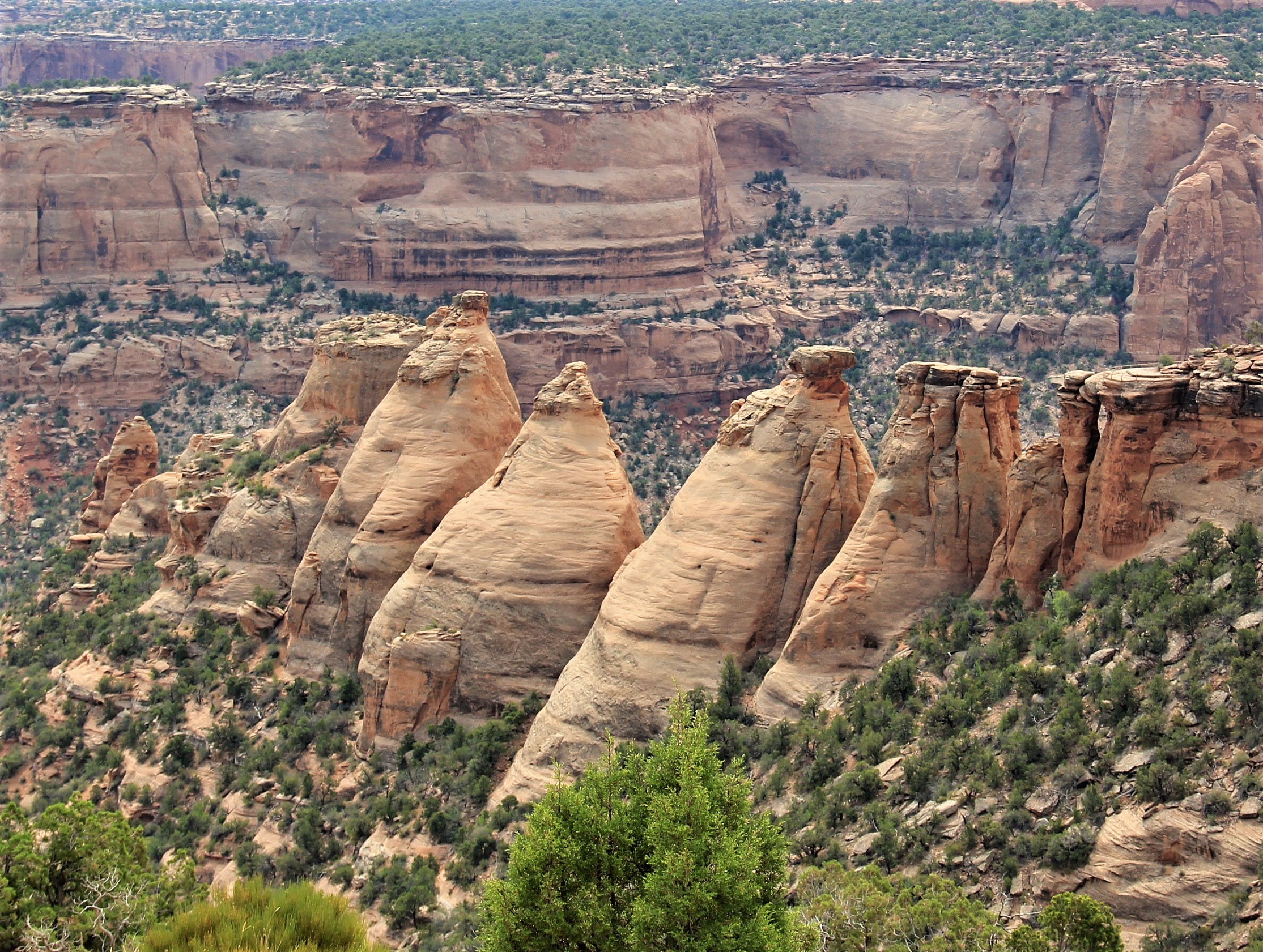
- North aspect

Highest point
- Elevation: 5,962 ft (1,817 m)
- Prominence: 72 ft (22 m)
- Parent peak: Black Ridge
- Isolation: 1.51 mi (2.43 km)
- Coordinates: 39°04′32″N 108°43′20″W

Geography
- Location within Colorado Location within the United States
- Country: United States
- State: Colorado
- County: Mesa
- Protected area: Colorado National Monument
- Parent range: Colorado Plateau; Uncompahgre Plateau
- Topo map: USGS Colorado National Monument

Geology
- Rock age: Late Triassic to Early Jurassic
- Rock type: Wingate Sandstone

Coke Ovens is a 5,962-foot-elevation (1,817-meter) linear set of pillars located in Colorado National Monument, in Mesa County of western Colorado, United States. This iconic landmark is situated on the west side of Monument Canyon, two miles south of the monument's visitor center, and 9 miles (14 km) west of the community of Grand Junction. It is also one mile south of Kissing Couple, and both can be seen from viewpoints along Rim Rock Drive. It is so named because the rounded shape resembles beehive coke ovens that were used in the nineteenth century to convert bituminous coal into coke, which was then used for smelting iron.

== Geology ==
This feature is the remnant of differentially eroded Wingate Sandstone, which consists of wind-borne, cross-bedded quartzose sandstones deposited as ancient sand dunes approximately 200 million years ago in the Late Triassic. The caprock at the top of one of the four pillars consists of fluvial sandstones of the resistant Kayenta Formation. The slope around the base of the Coke Ovens is Chinle Formation. The floor of the canyon is Precambrian basement rock consisting of gneiss, schist, and granites. Precipitation runoff from this geographical feature drains to the Colorado River, approximately four miles to the northeast.

== Climate ==
According to the Köppen climate classification system, Coke Ovens is located in a semi-arid climate zone. Summers are hot and dry, while winters are cold with some snow. Temperatures reach 100 °F (38 °C) on 5.3 days, 90 °F (32 °C) on 57 days, and remain at or below freezing on 13 days annually. The months April through October offer the most favorable weather to visit.

== Gallery ==
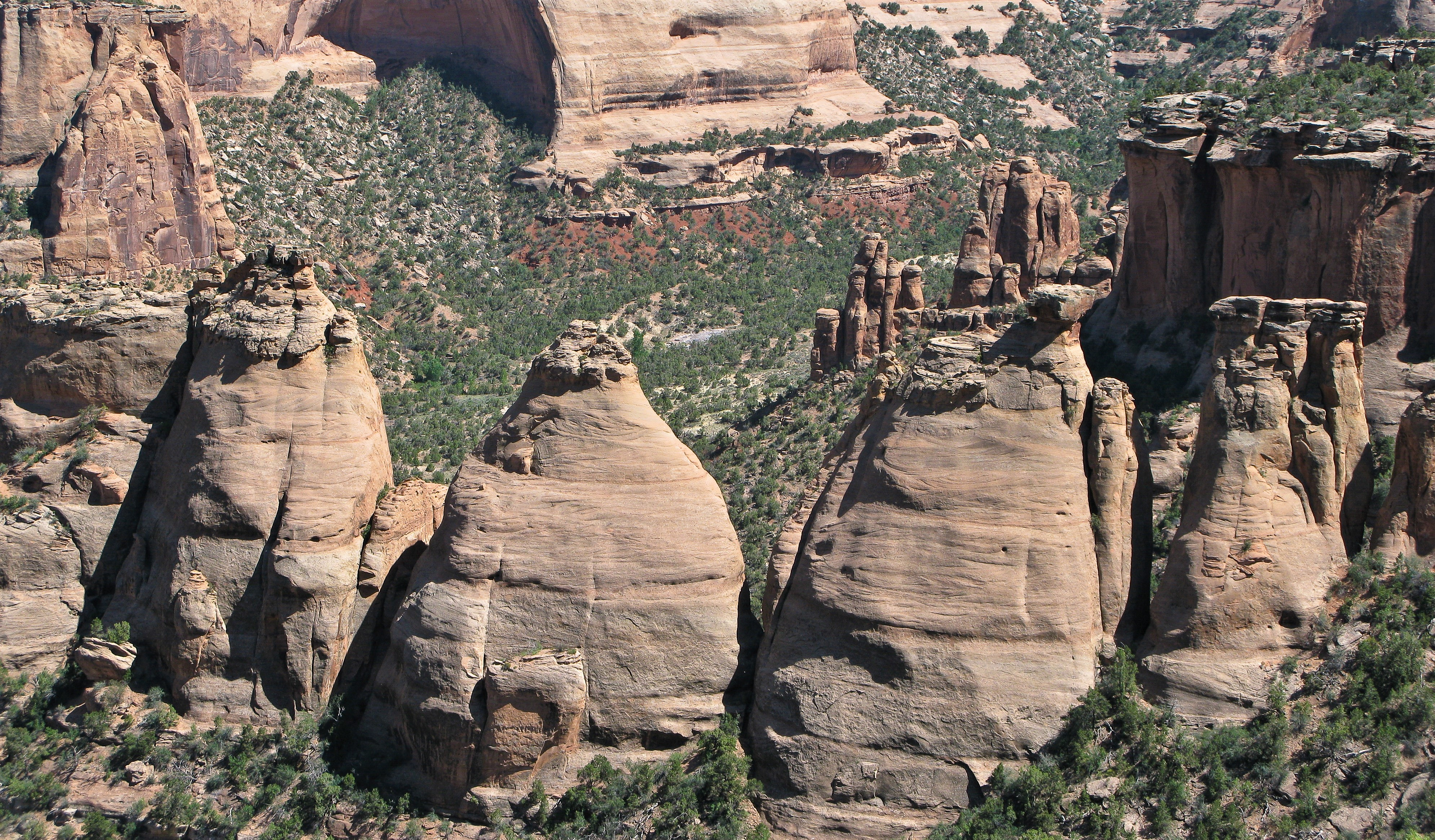

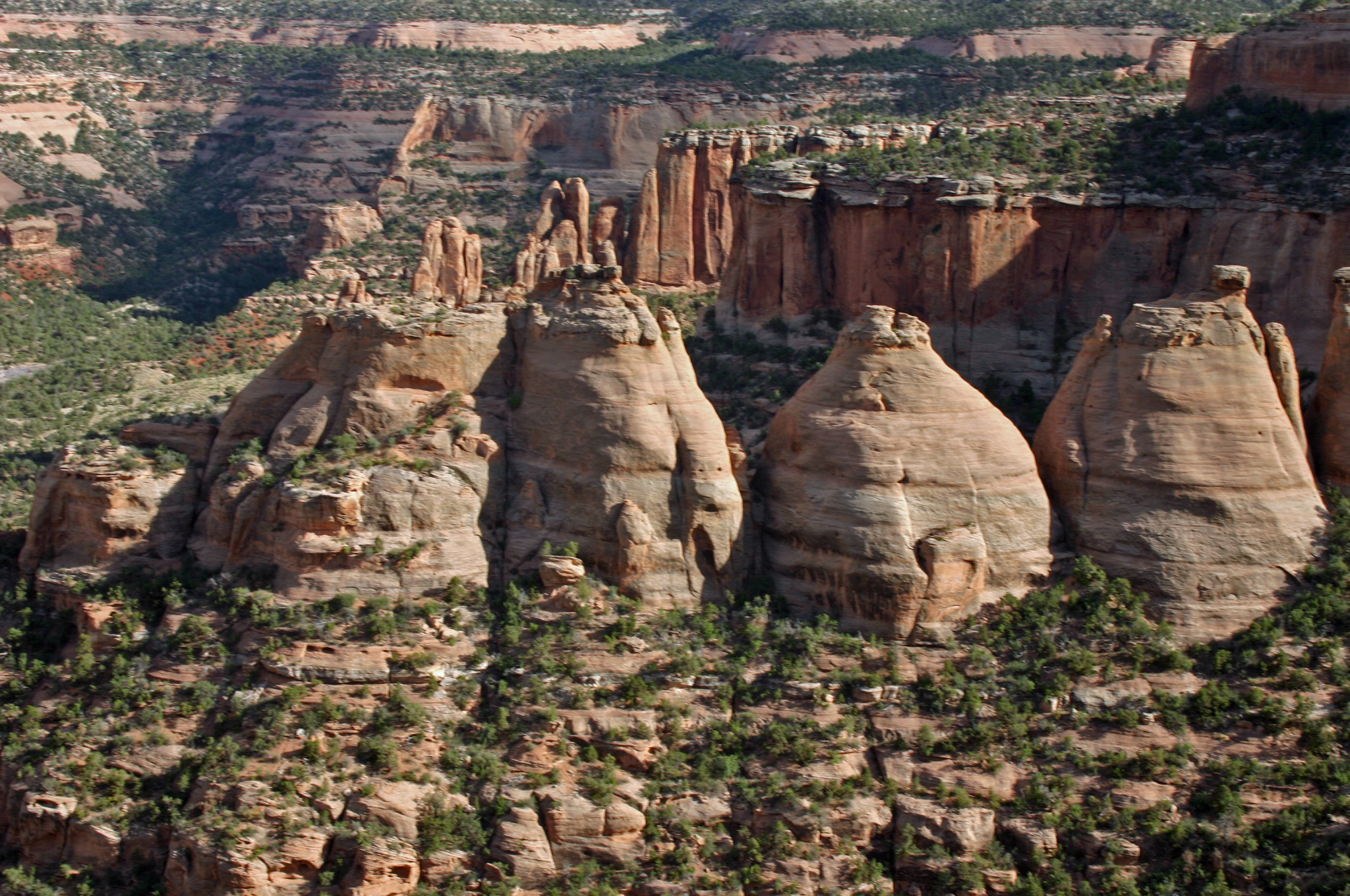

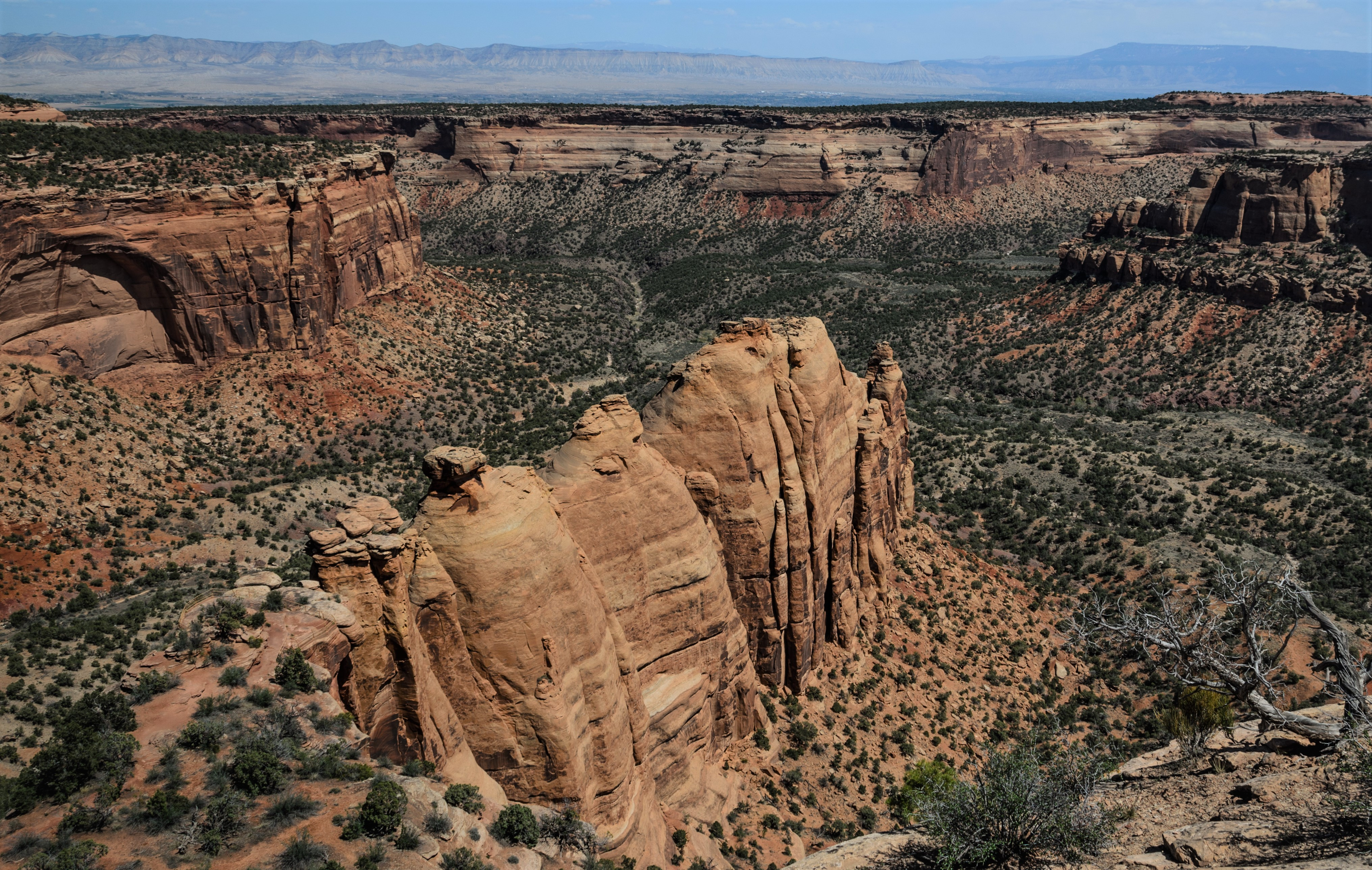

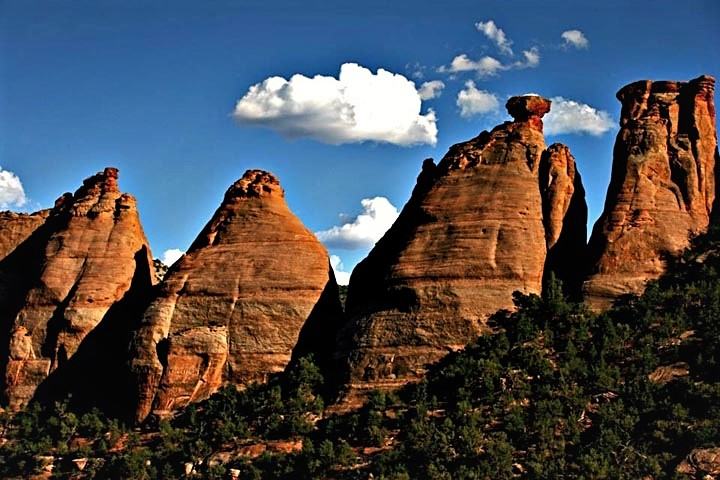

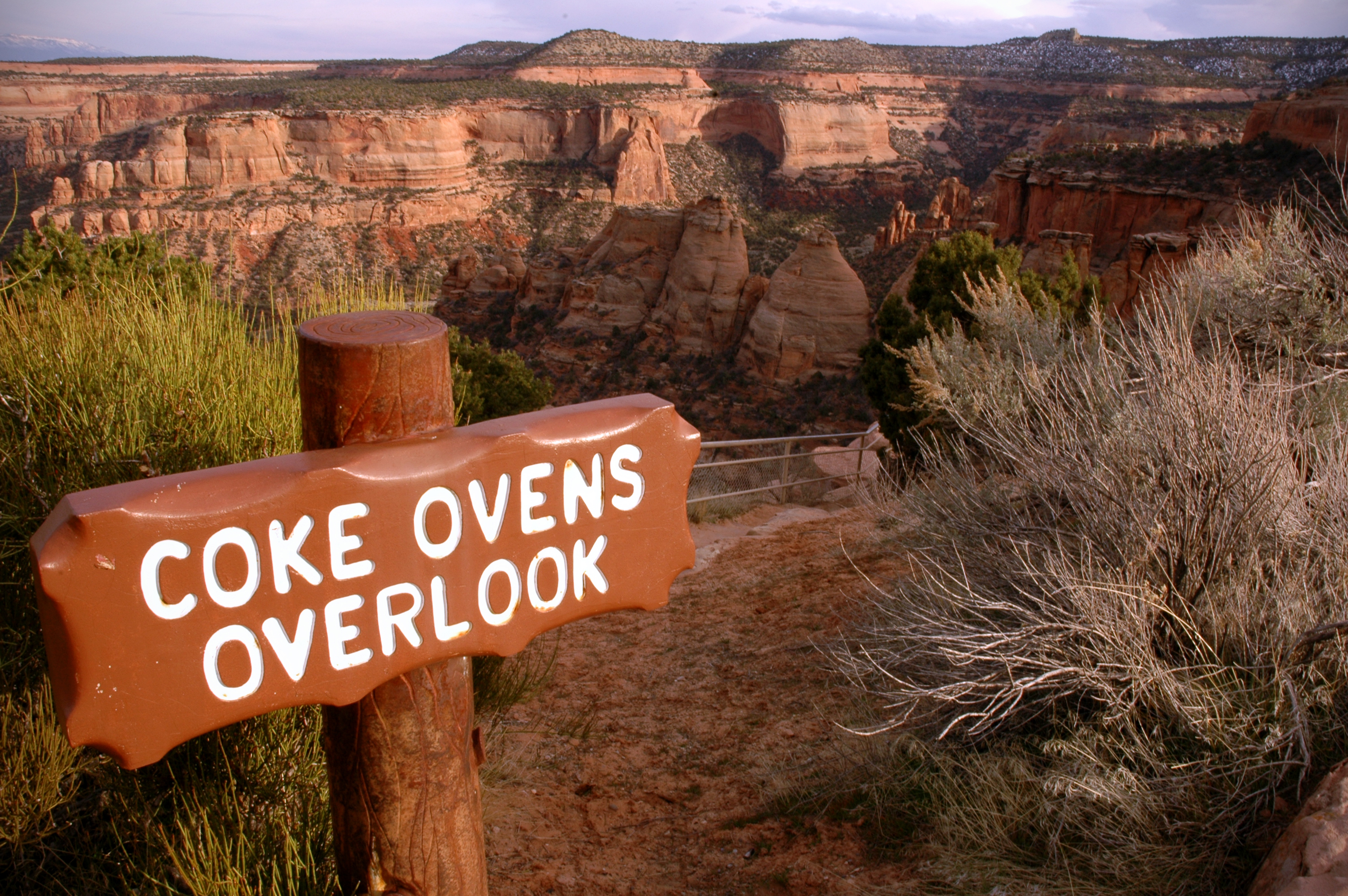

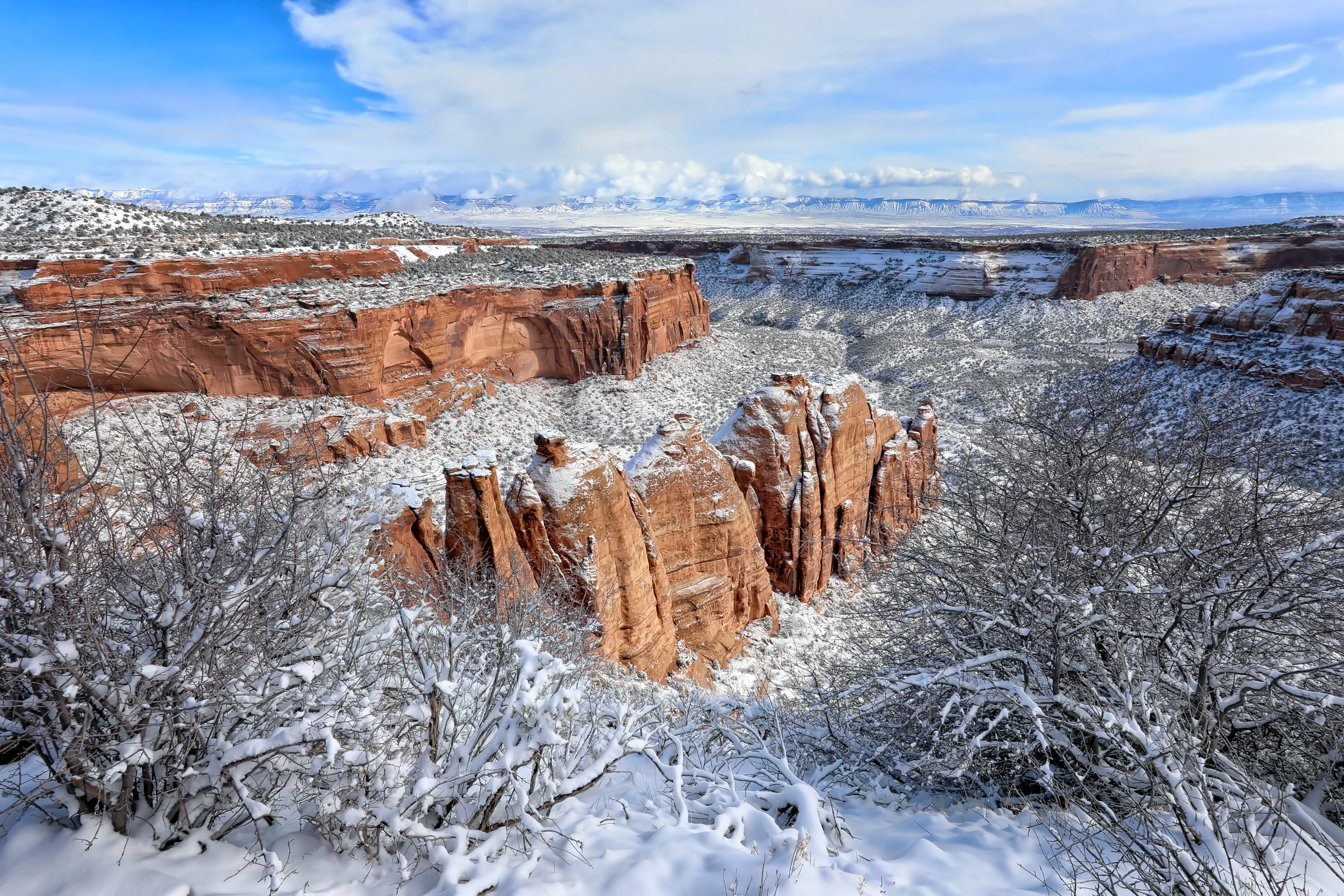

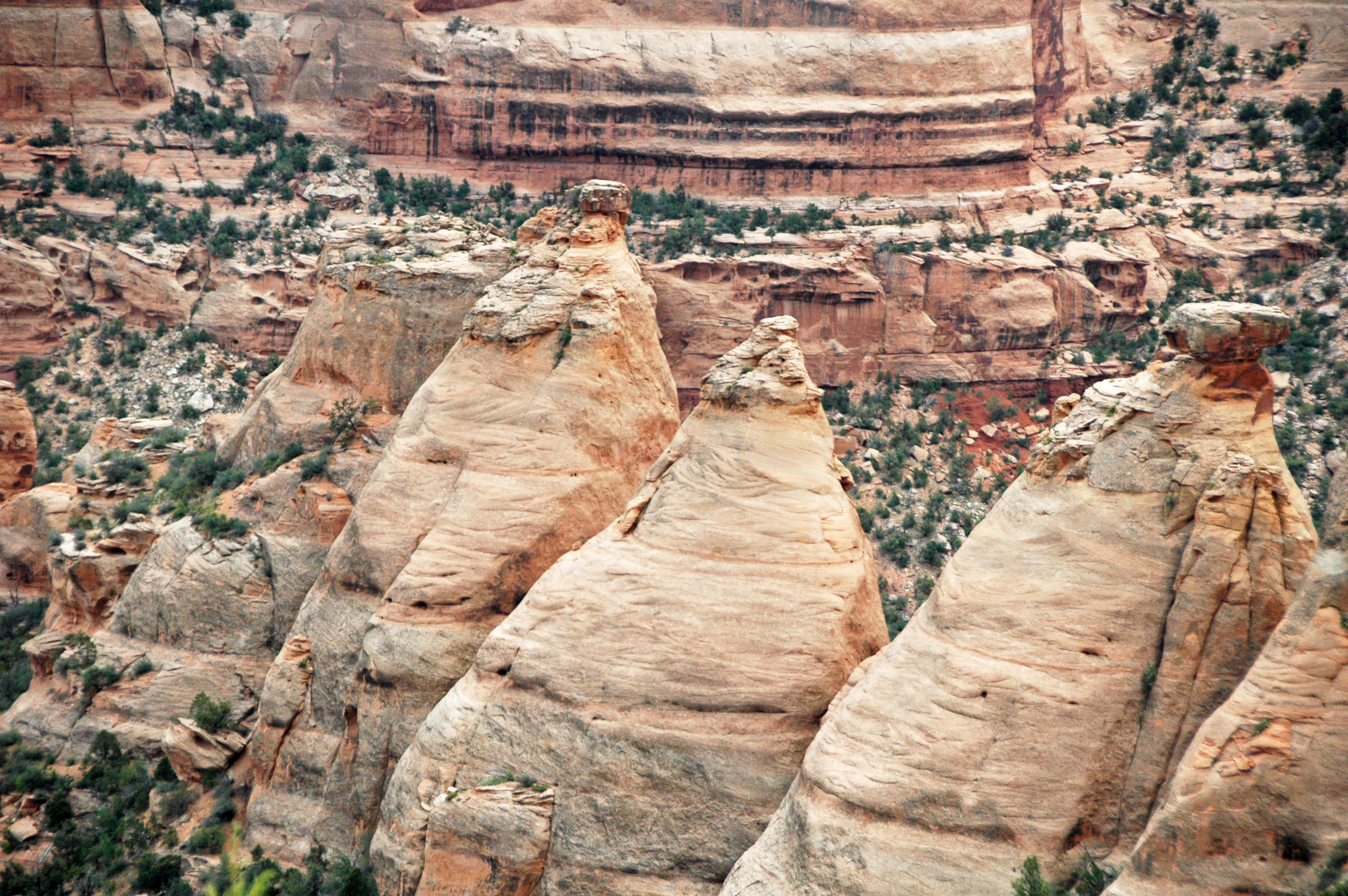

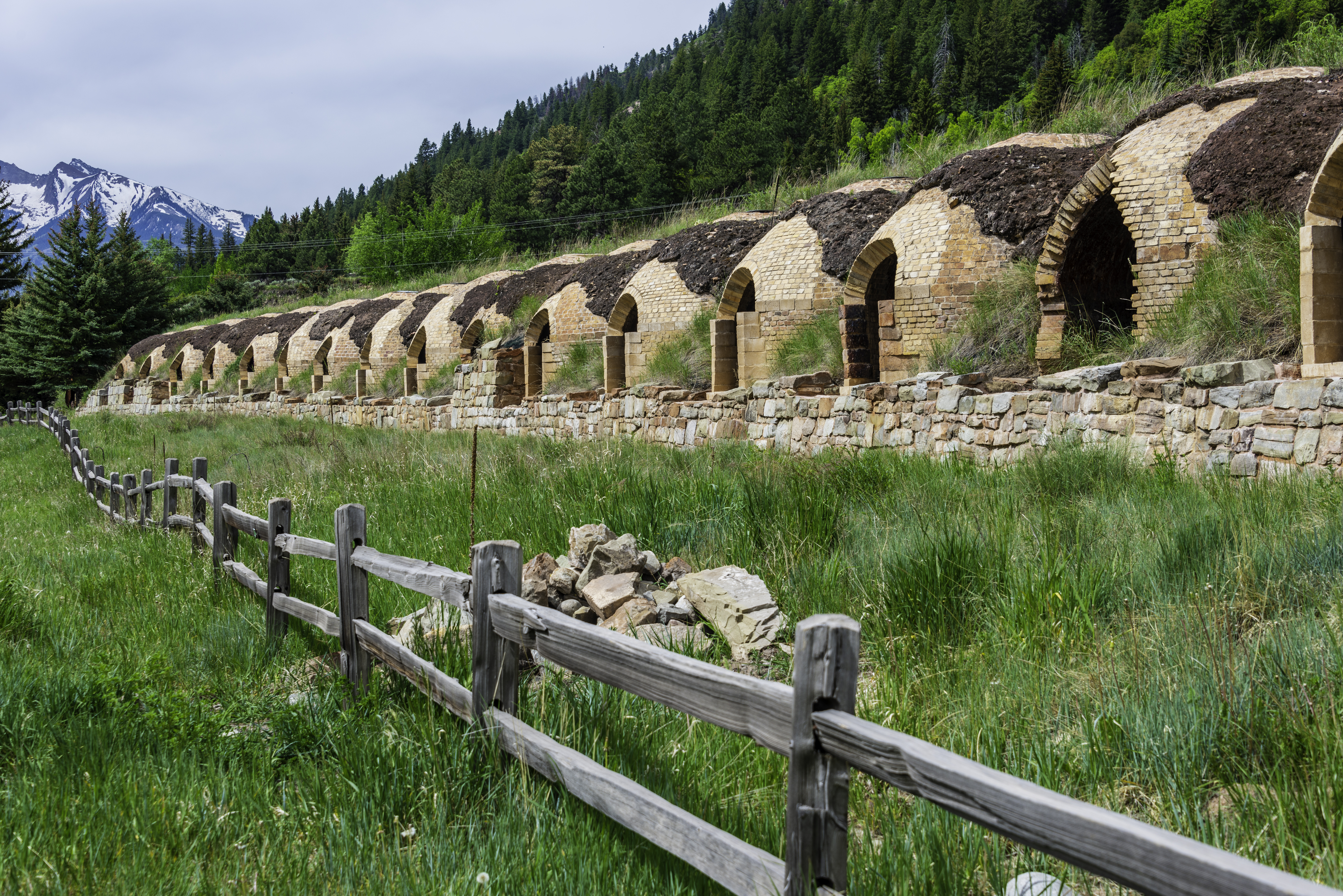
Actual beehive coke ovens, also in Colorado

== See also ==
- List of rock formations in the United States
