= Saddlehorn Comfort Station =

- U.S. National Register of Historic Places
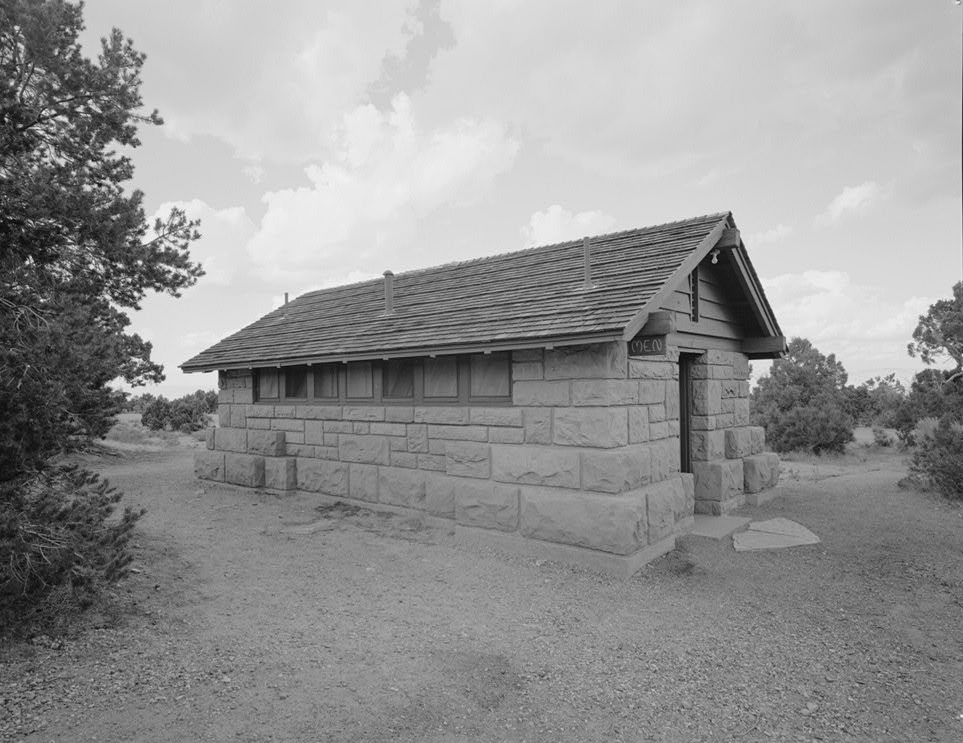

- Location within Colorado Location within the United States
- Nearest city: Grand Junction, Colorado
- Coordinates: 39°6′17″N 108°44′23″W
- Built: 1937
- Architect: W. G. Carnes, NPS, CCC
- MPS: Colorado National Monument MPS
- NRHP reference No.: 94000305
- Added to NRHP: April 21, 1994

The Saddlehorn Comfort Station is one of a group of related structures listed on the National Register of Historic Places in Colorado National Monument. The comfort station (otherwise known as a public toilet) and the nearby caretaker's house, garage and the Saddlehorn Utility Area Historic District feature a consistent interpretation of the National Park Service Rustic style, featuring coursed ashlar sandstone masonry and log-supported roof structure. The comfort station was designed in 1936 by W.G. Carney of the National Park Service Branch of Plans and Designs, and built by labor from the Works Progress Administration and the Civilian Conservation Corps. Plans specified not only the general layout of the house and garage, but the specific dimensions of each stone and its location, using a technique of "built by detail".

The comfort station is located at the intersection of Rim Rock Drive and the Saddlehorn Loop, named after a distinctive nearby rock formation. Construction was carried out by craftsmen, known as LEM's (Local Experienced Men), with suitable skills, stonemasons of Italian descent. Much of the material came from Rim Rock Drive construction. The comfort station was built by the men of CCC camp NM-2-C.

The three Saddlehorn National Register properties were nominated to the National Register of Historic Places as a multiple property submission on the basis of their related design and history.
