= Saddlehorn Utility Area Historic District =

Historic district in Colorado, United States

- U.S. National Register of Historic Places
- U.S. Historic district
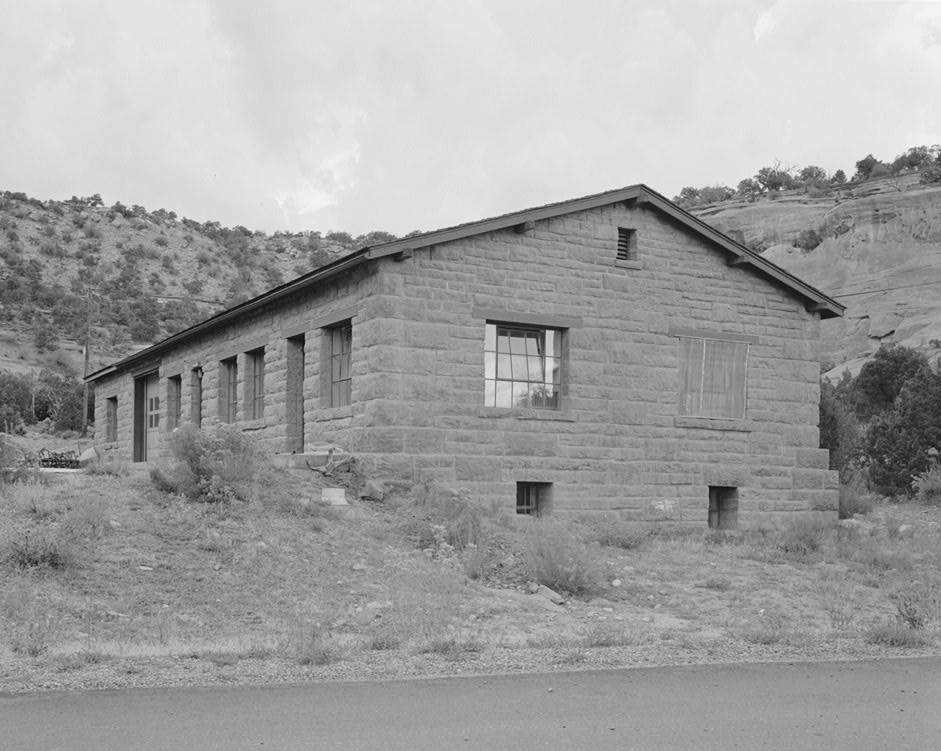
- Saddlehorn Warehouse

- Location within Colorado Location within the United States
- Nearest city: Grand Junction, Colorado
- Coordinates: 39°6′5″N 108°44′17″W
- Built: 1937
- Architect: NPS; CCC
- MPS: Colorado National Monument MPS
- NRHP reference No.: 94000308
- Added to NRHP: April 21, 1994

The Saddlehorn Utility Area Historic District in Colorado National Monument comprises a complex of park service buildings, designed by the National Park Service Branch of Plans and Designs in the National Park Service Rustic style. The primary designer was National Park Service architect Kenneth M. Saunders, who employed the local red sandstone in the buildings, which included shops, fuel shed, repair and storage buildings. The buildings were constructed in 1941 by Public Works Administration and Civilian Conservation Corps labor.

The utility area is located at the intersection of Rim Rock Drive and the Saddle horn Loop, named after a distinctive nearby rock formation. It is separated from the caretaker's house by a low hill. Construction was carried out by craftsmen, known as LEM's (Local Experienced Men), with suitable skills, reputedly stonemasons of Italian descent. Much of the material came from Rim Rock Drive construction.

The three Saddlehorn National Register properties were nominated to the National Register of Historic Places as a multiple property submission on the basis of their related design and history. The utility area was built by CCC camp NM-2-C.

== See also ==
- Saddlehorn Comfort Station
