= Saddlehorn Caretaker's House and Garage =

Historic house in Colorado, United States

- U.S. National Register of Historic Places
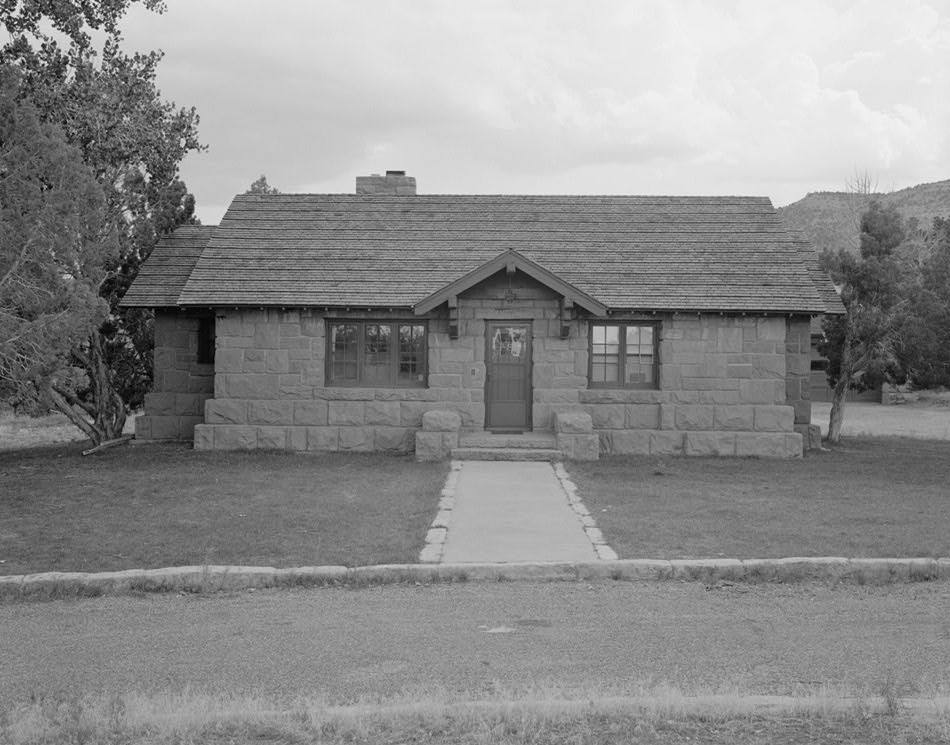
- Saddlehorn Residence

- Location within Colorado Location within the United States
- Nearest city: Grand Junction, Colorado
- Coordinates: 39°6′5″N 108°43′59″W
- Built: 1935
- Architect: W. G. Carney, NPS, CCC
- MPS: Colorado National Monument MPS
- NRHP reference No.: 94000306
- Added to NRHP: April 21, 1994

The Saddlehorn Caretaker's House and Garage, also known as the Stone House, the Rock House, and the Superintendent's Quarters is a house and asset listed as part of the National Register of Historic Places located in the Colorado National Monument.

== History ==
=== Design and construction ===
The Saddlehorn Caretaker's House and Garage was designed in 1934 by architect W.G. Carney of the National Park Service's Western Division of the Branch of Plans and Design. The structure was built between 1935 and 1936 by members of the Civil Conservation Corps, its construction being funded with money appropriated from the Emergency Conservation Work (ECW) Act of 1933. The house and the associated properties are located at the intersection of Rim Rock Drive and the Saddlehorn Loop, named after a distinctive nearby rock formation. Many of the construction workers were sourced from the CCC and were hired with New Deal Relief appropriations. They were trained by locally sourced stonemasons and carpenters. The construction was administered by Public Works Administration. Materials for the build were sourced from the immediate vicinity around the site, and from the Rim Rock Drive construction project, which was also located in the Colorado National Monument.

=== Functions ===
The structure was designed with a domestic nature in mind. The house and garage was used to shelter workers of the Civilian Conservation Corps. The workers were based out of Camp NM-2-C, which was set up in March 1933 at the Monument Canyon trail-head but was moved to a more permanent location at Saddlehorn. There had been no permanent structure for the CCC to use while working in the area up until the construction of the building.

In addition to the Caretaker's house, there had also been plans drawn up in 1935 to construct:

- A baseball field (labeled "Baseball Field for CCC Camp")
- A permanent administration building to take over from the Caretaker's house
- A recreation hall
- A mess hall
- A latrine
- Five barracks to house workers

Plans for a much larger, more permanent camp had been finalized by mid-1935. There is a record from the park's Chief Ranger that one of the structures was set on fire as a fire training exercise. The last buildings were removed in the early 1960s when newer facilities were built elsewhere.

The Caretaker's House and Garage ceased to be used in 1942, as the majority of workers either volunteered or were drafted into military service in World War II. The National Register of Historic Places lists the house and garage as 'vacant/not in use' as of June 2020.

== Architecture ==
The exterior of the structure is described by Kathy McCoy of the National Park Service as being:

"...gabled, of moderate rise, and is covered with cedar shingles. The main structure at the gable ends has weatherboard wood siding with exposed log purlin ends. Louvered vents are located under each gable. The residence has one off-center coursed ashlar sandstone chimney. The two small wings at either end of the building have gabled roofs. All wood trim is painted rust color. A detached stone garage is located to the southwest and is associated with the residence."

The interior features a living room, two bedrooms, a kitchen, and bathroom. The kitchen, bathroom, and basement were remodeled in 1973.

The materials used in its construction include locally sourced red sandstone, much of which came from the immediate vicinity of the buildings, logs, and concrete as a foundation.

== See also ==
- Saddlehorn Utility Area Historic District
- Saddlehorn Comfort Station
- Colorado National Monument
- Civilian Conservation Corps
