= Devils Kitchen Picnic Shelter =

- U.S. National Register of Historic Places
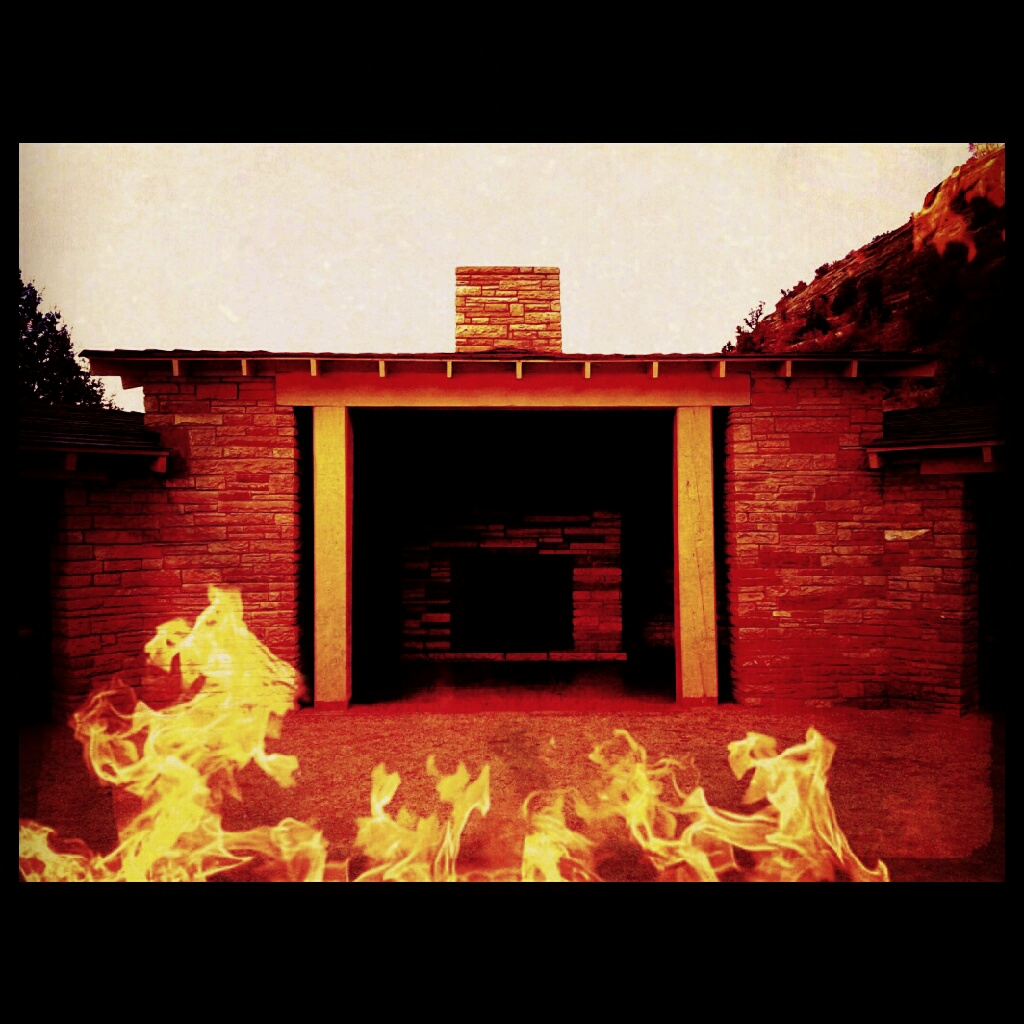
- Devils Kitchen Picnic Shelter

- Location within Colorado Location within the United States
- Nearest city: Grand Junction, Colorado
- Coordinates: 39°1′58″N 108°37′59″W
- Built: 1941
- Architect: H. Cornell, NPS, CCC
- MPS: Colorado National Monument MPS
- NRHP reference No.: 94000309
- Added to NRHP: April 21, 1994

The Devils Kitchen Picnic Shelter in Colorado National Monument was designed by Harvey H. Cornell, Jerome C. Miller and Kenneth M. Saunders of the National Park Service Branch of Plans and Design in 1940. It was built by workers from the Civilian Conservation Corps and the Public Works Administration in 1941, in the National Park Service Rustic style. The shelter features three sandstone fireplaces, as well as toilets and service facilities.

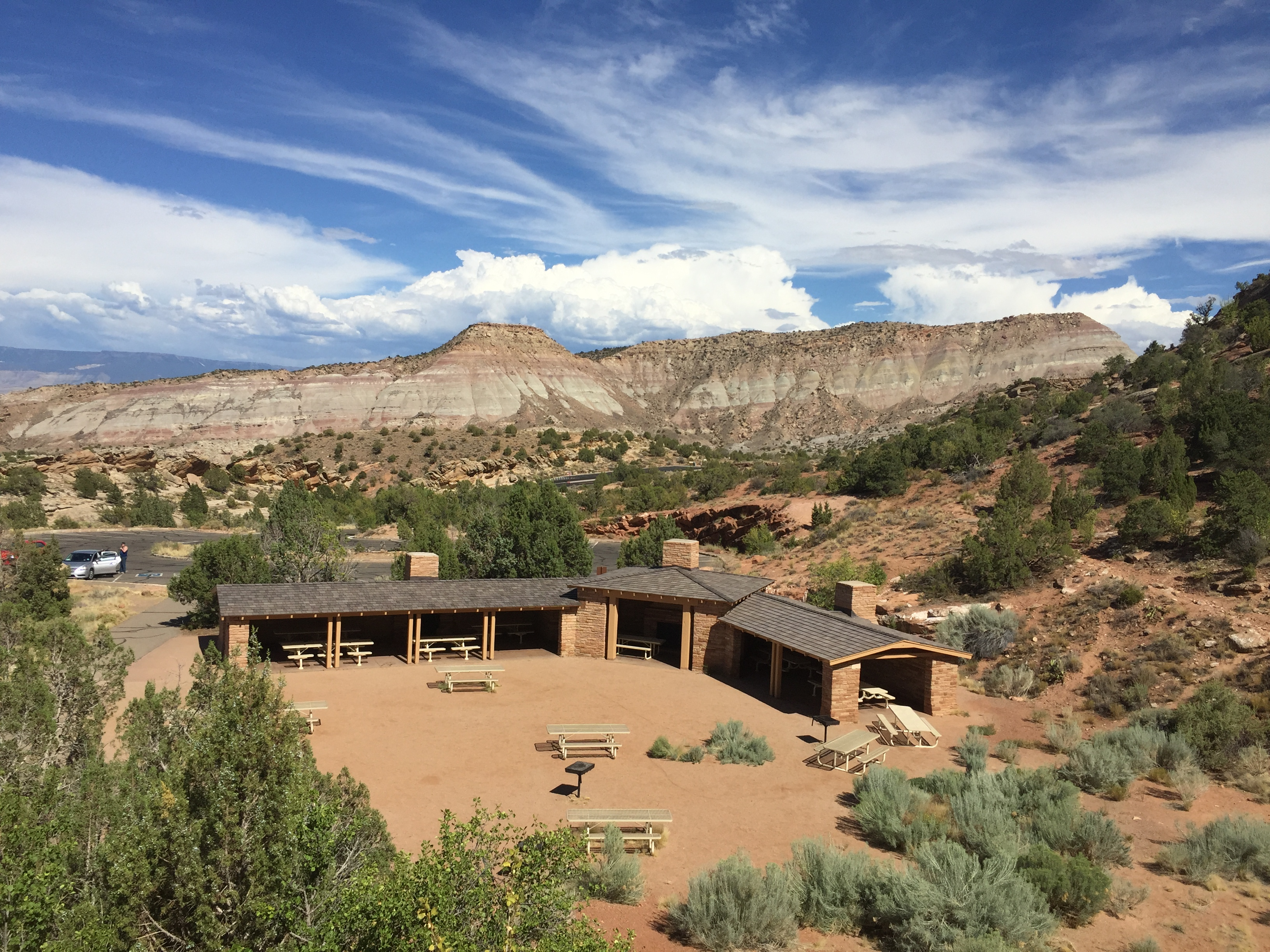
View in 2018

Construction was carried out by craftsmen, known as LEM's (Local Experienced Men), with suitable skills, reputedly stonemasons of Italian descent. Much of the material came from Rim Rock Drive construction. The picnic shelter was built by the men of CCC camp NM-2-C.

The shelter is unusual due to its large size and diversified function.
