= Cisco, Utah =

- Ghost town
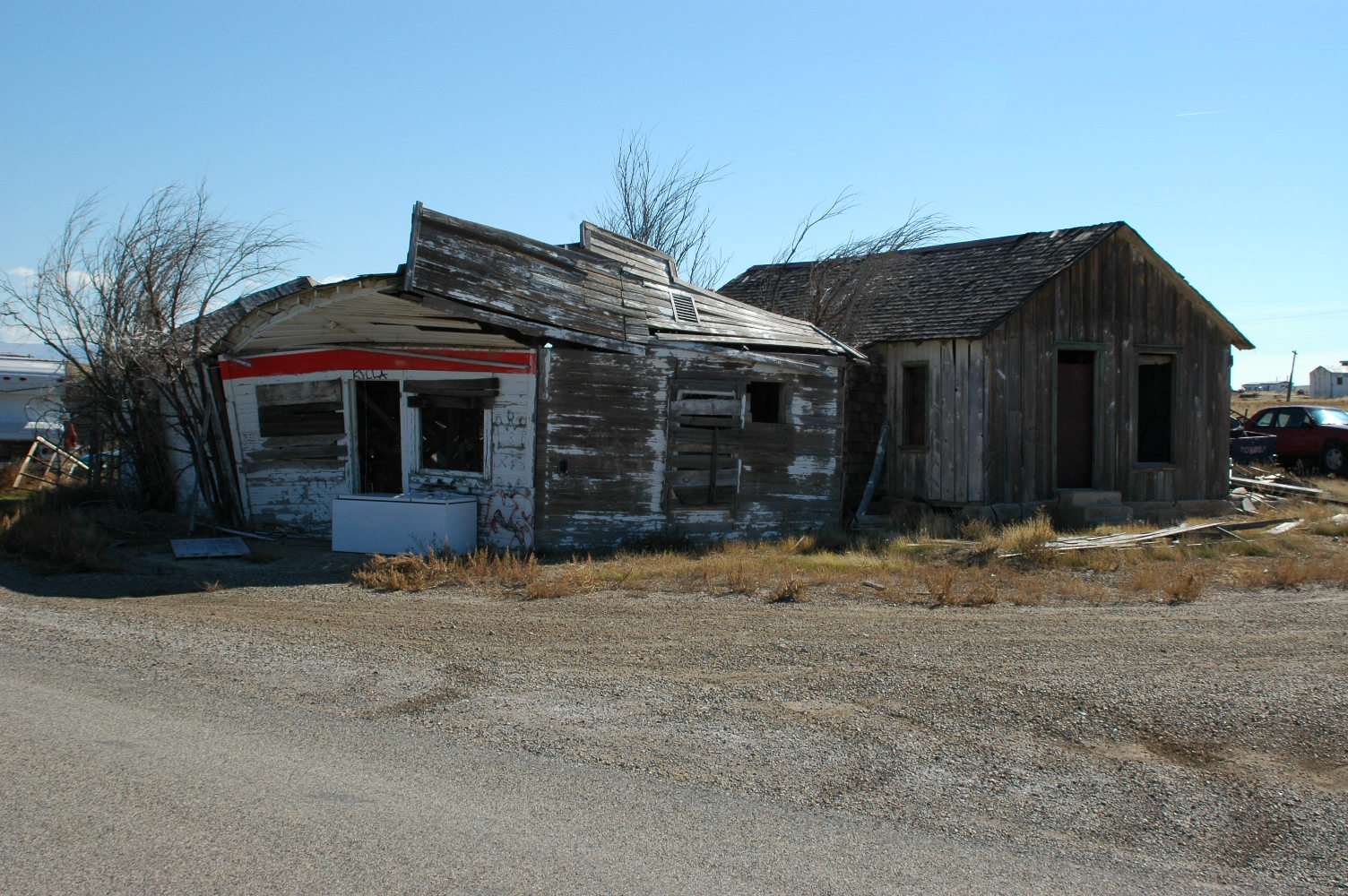
- Buildings in Cisco

- Location within the state of Utah Cisco (the United States)
- Coordinates: 38°58′12″N 109°19′14″W
- Country: United States
- State: Utah
- County: Grand

Population (2020)
  - Total: 4
  - Estimate (2019): 1
- Time zone: UTC-7 (Mountain (MST))
  - Summer (DST): UTC-6 (MDT)

Cisco is a ghost town in Grand County, Utah, United States near the junction of State Route 128 (SR‑128) and Interstate 70 (I‑70).

== History ==
The town started in the 1880s as a saloon and water-refilling station for the Denver and Rio Grande Western Railroad. Stores, hotels, and restaurants sprang up to accommodate work crews and later travelers. Nearby cattle ranchers and sheep herders in the Book Cliffs north of town began using Cisco as a livestock and provisioning center. Around the turn of the 20th century sheep were sheared at Cisco before being shipped to market. After oil and natural gas were discovered, Cisco continued to grow. The town's decline coincided with the demise of the steam locomotive. Cisco's already declining economy crashed when Interstate 70 was built, bypassing the town.

The town site contains many relics of a typical old west railroad town. Cisco survived long enough into the 20th century to be assigned a ZIP Code, 84515. The ghost town's easy access and proximity to the freeway lured vandals who heavily damaged the historical artifacts. While Cisco had no permanent residents for many years, there are many known shale oil deposits around Cisco, and efforts have been made over the years to extract this shale leading to the town having a few migrant residents working for the oil drilling firms involved.

The town was also used in filming the opening and ending scenes of the 1971 cult classic movie Vanishing Point.

== Mining ==
Oil and natural gas were discovered near Cisco in 1924. In 2005, new oil and gas wells were drilled in the nearby Cisco Oil Field by a Reno, Nevada-based company. Newly drilled wells can be seen next to the railroad track and around the freeway. Cisco Mayor Dan Vanover was also an oil and turquoise miner from 1963 until his death in 1986.

== Transportation ==
Cisco is along the former routing of US-6/US-50. The town was bypassed with the completion of I‑70 through the area but is still accessible by way of Exit 204. Cisco is listed as a control city for SR‑128, although the highway does not enter Cisco. Cisco is still served by the Union Pacific Railroad where a rail siding remains in use. The California Zephyr passenger train passes through Cisco, but is not a scheduled stop. During the summer months, whitewater river rafters use Cisco as a landing site, particularly for a trip through Westwater Canyon. The Kokopelli mountain bike Trail passes through Cisco.

== Gallery ==
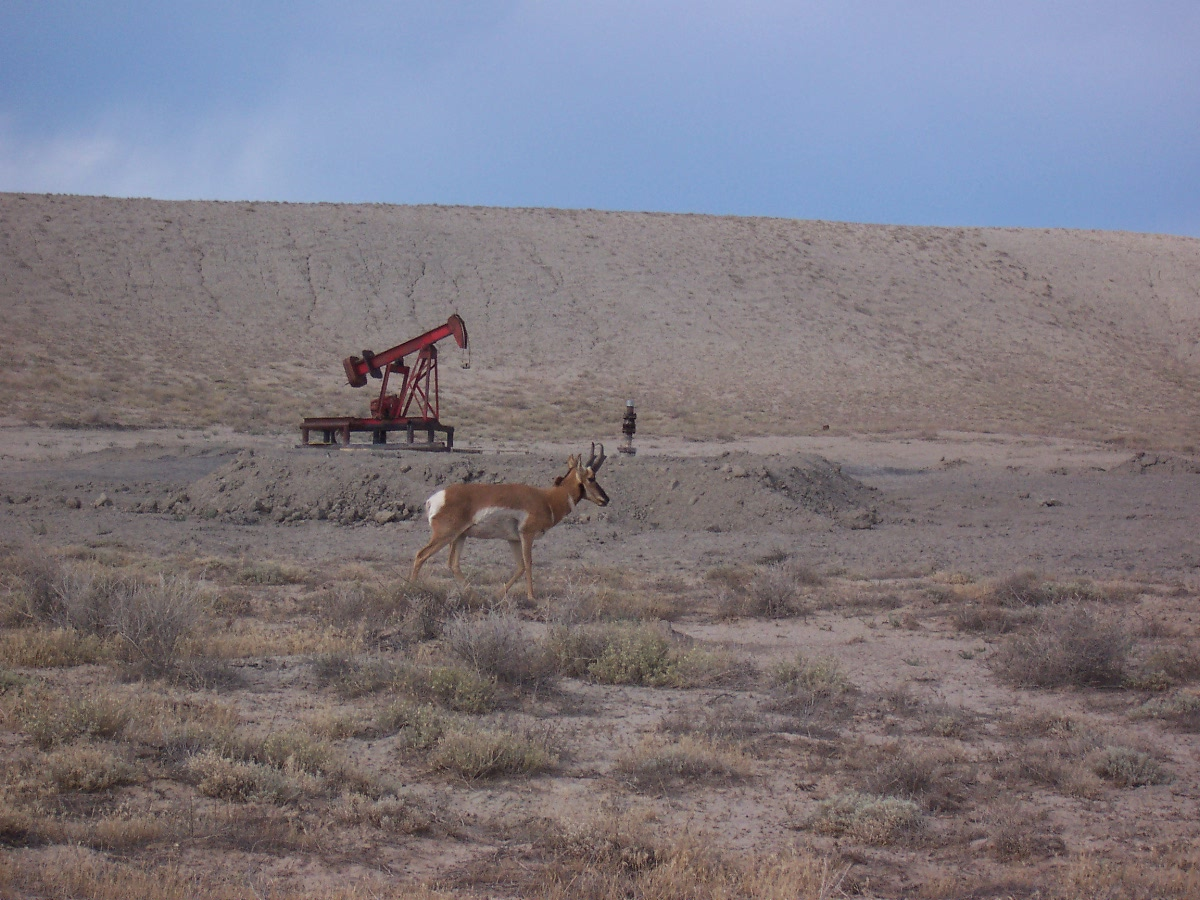
Oil wells in Cisco

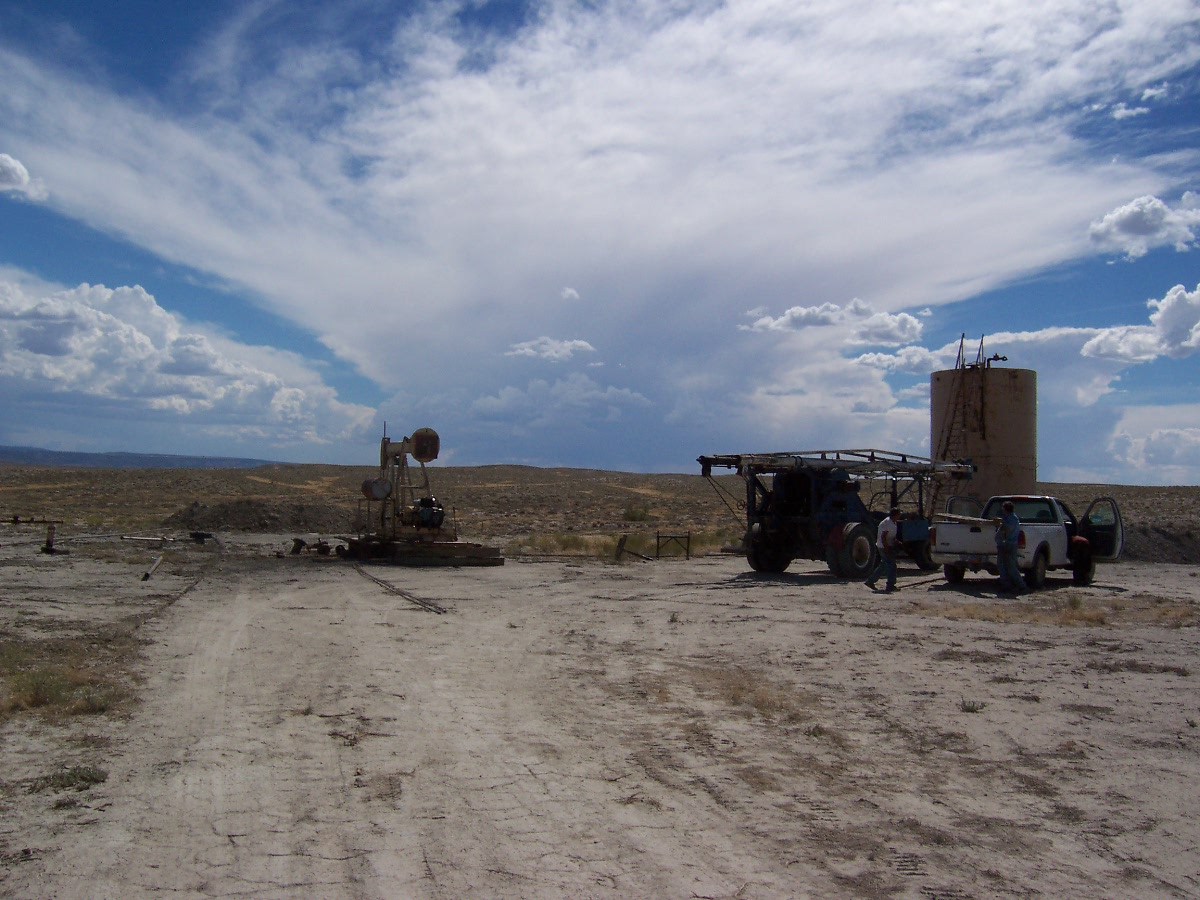
Cisco oil field

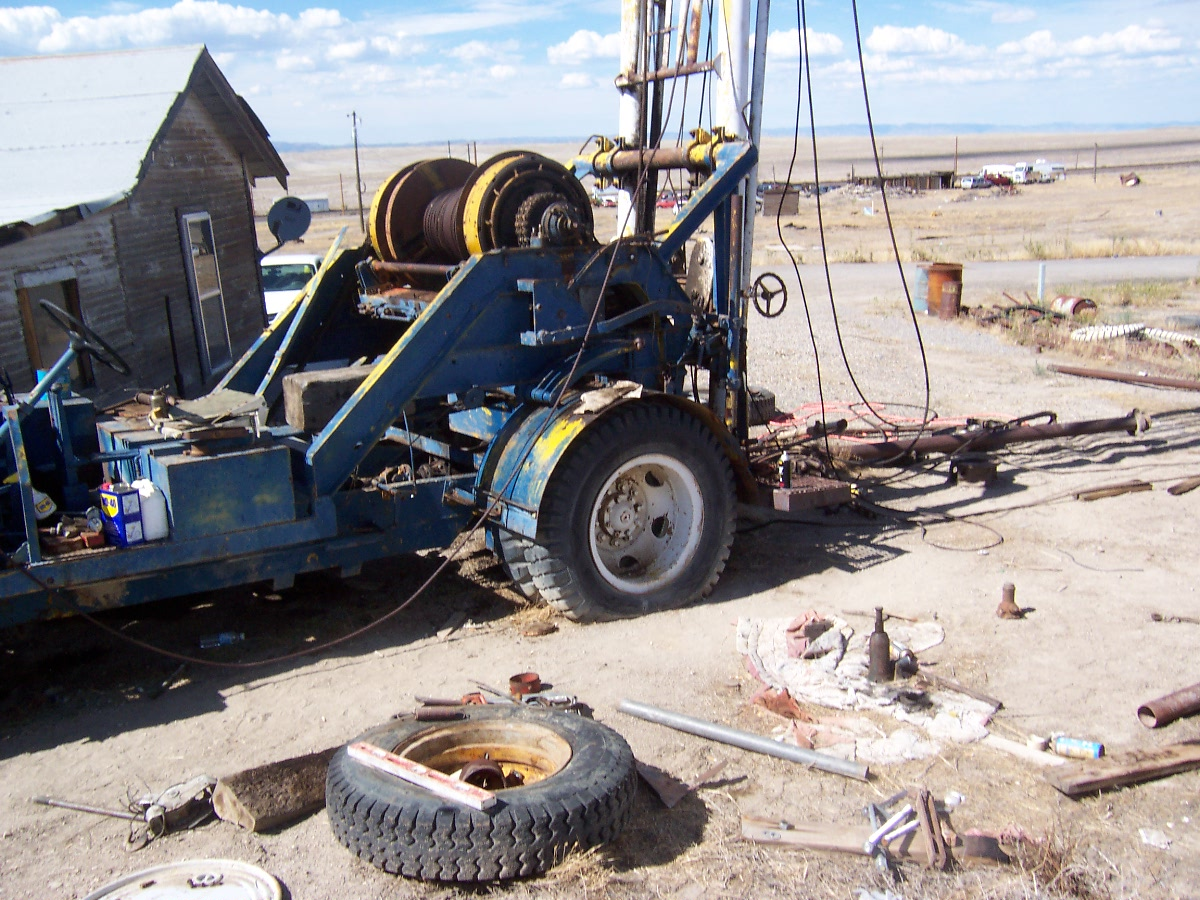
Cisco Yellow House with 1932 rig

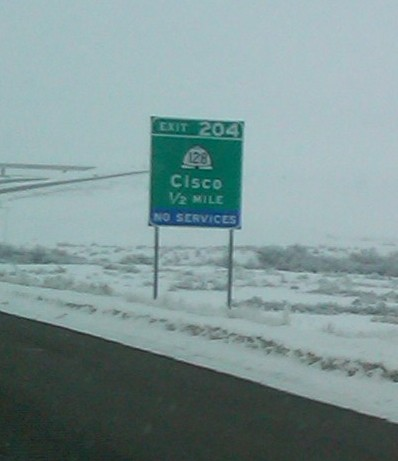
Exit sign on westbound Interstate 70

== Climate ==
According to the Köppen Climate Classification system, Cisco has a semi-arid climate, abbreviated "BSk" on climate maps.

== See also ==
- Daqiu Island village, another ghost town with one modern inhabitant
