= Jay Guy Cisco =

- Born: April 25, 1844; New Orleans, Louisiana, U.S.
- Died: April 24, 1922 (aged 77); Nashville, Tennessee, U.S.
- Occupations: Journalist, diplomat, businessman
- Spouse: Mildred George Pursley
- Children: 4 sons, 2 daughters
- Military career
- Allegiance: Confederate States of America (1861–1865)
- Branch: Confederate States Army
- Service years: 1861–1865

Jay Guy Cisco (April 25, 1844 - April 24, 1922) was an American Confederate veteran, journalist, diplomat and businessman. He was the owner of a bookstore and the editor of the Forked Deer Blade newspaper in Jackson, Tennessee. He was a U.S. consul to Mexico, and an agent for the Louisville and Nashville Railroad.

== Early life ==
Cisco was born on April 25, 1844, in New Orleans, Louisiana. During the American Civil War of 1861–1865, he served in the Confederate States Army. He subsequently traveled to Europe.

== Career ==
Cisco moved to Jackson, Tennessee, where he was the owner of a bookstore known as Cisco's Bookstore. He became the editor of the Forked Deer Blade in Jackson in 1883. He was a proponent of prohibition.

Cisco was appointed as a consul to Mexico by President Grover Cleveland in 1888. He was an agent for the Louisville and Nashville Railroad from 1897 to 1922.

== Personal life and death ==
Cisco married Mildred George Pursley; they had four sons and two daughters. They resided at 912 Boscobel Street in Nashville.

Cisco died on April 24, 1922, in Nashville.

== Works ==
- Cisco, Jay Guy (1909). Historic Sumner County, Tennessee, with Genealogies of the Bledsoe, Cage and Douglass Families and Genealogical Notes of Other Sumner Families. Nashville, Tennessee: Folk-Keelin Printing Company. OCLC 5692694972.
