= Cisco Oil Field =

Oil field located in Grand County, Utah, USA

Coordinates: 38°58′11″N 109°19′08″W

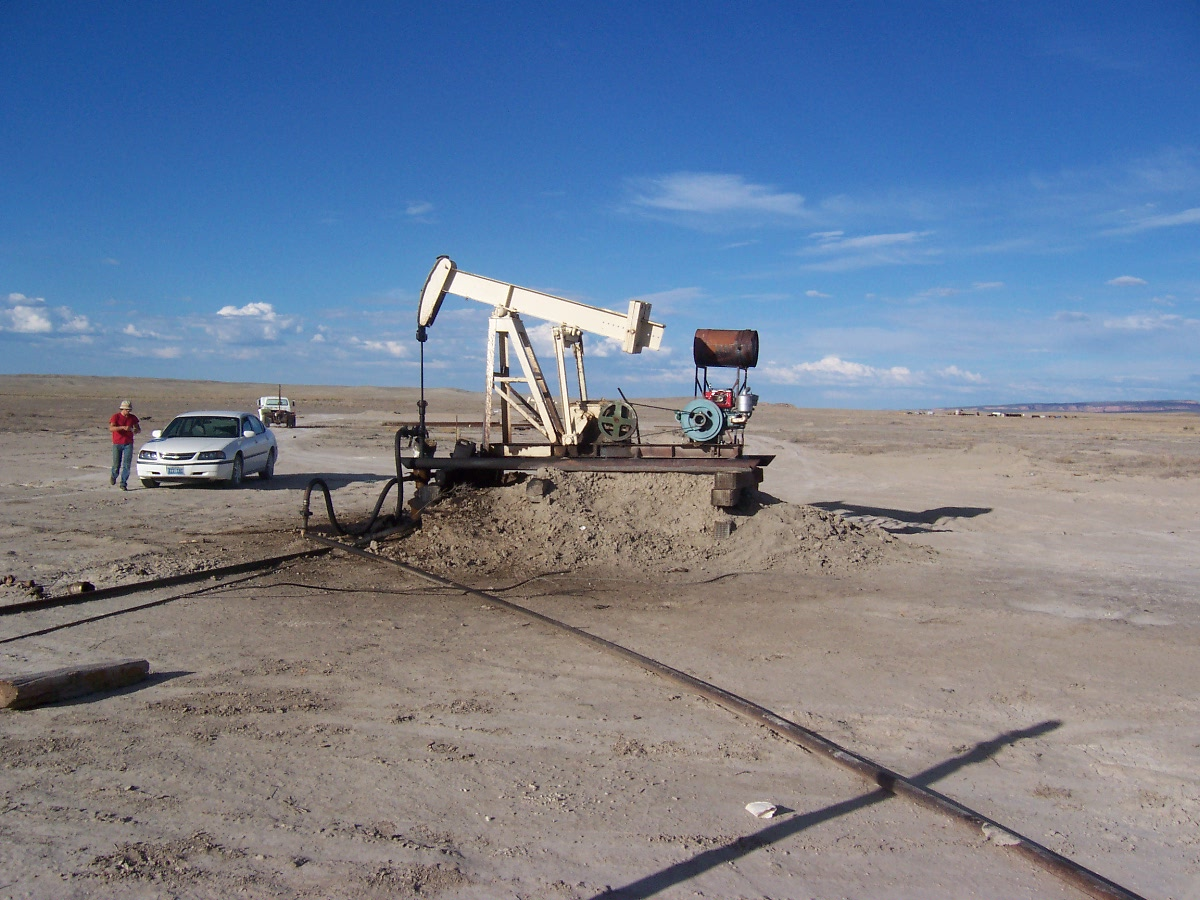
Oil well in Cisco, Utah

Cisco Oil Field is an oil field located in Grand County, Utah. The field was discovered in 1924 in the now abandoned town of Cisco, Utah. It is one of the oldest oil fields in the state of Utah. The field has been developed intermittently since then with the discovery of several small accumulations of oil. The field lies along a larger feature known as the Uncompahgre Uplift which is a boundary between Paradox Basin, the Uintah Basin and the Piceance Basin.

The field is a series of localized oil accumulations that are produced from several different channel sands in the Mancos, Cedar Mountain, Dakota, Saltwash and Brushy Basin zones (Morgan, 1999 and 2001). Natural gas and oil are produced from the Mancos, Cedar Mountain and Dakota formations, while the Brushy Basin and Saltwash production is mostly crude oil.

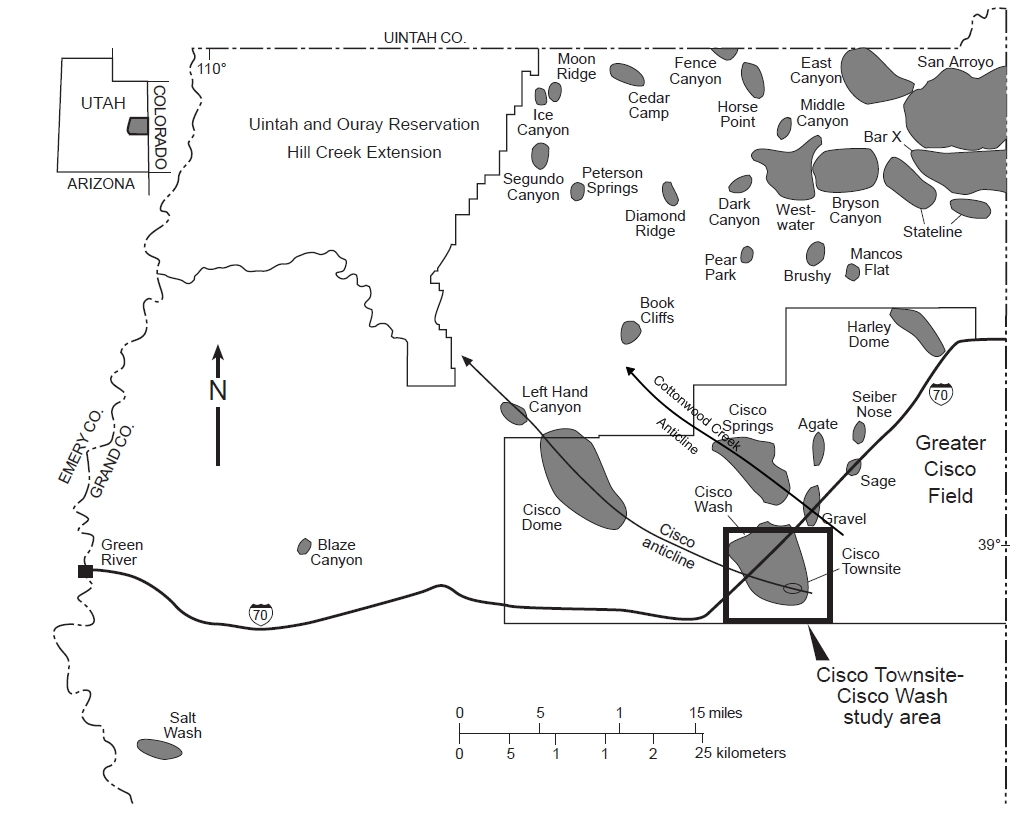
Cisco Springs Oil Field in relation to other fields in the area and along the Cottonwood Creek Anticline

The productive reservoirs are either structurally controlled by Horst and Graben features or isolated stratigraphic traps related to either lithological or permeability pinchouts (Tedesco, 2013). The field is along Cotton Creek Anticline (Morgan, 1999). The depth for production ranges from 900 to 2,000 feet (270 to 610 m). The field straddles the I-70 highway between Moab and Grand Junction.

The oil gravity is 34–35 degrees API while the natural gas is 1,100 BTU (1,200 kJ). The oil is derived locally as in the Mancos, Cedar Mountain and Dakota sandstones from the adjacent Dakota shale. The oil in these reservoirs is typically a moderate to light green color. The oil found in the Saltwash and Brushy Basin reservoirs contains a heavier black oil that is Pennsylvanian in age and has migrated from the adjacent Paradox Basin.
