= Sisko =

Sisco or Sisko may refer to:

== Places ==
- Sisco, Haute-Corse, Corsica, France, a commune
- Sisco (stream), Corsica, France, which flows through the commune
- Sisco, Florida, United States, a ghost town
- Sisco Mesa, Antarctica

== People ==
- Andrew Sisco (born 1983), American baseball pitcher
- Chance Sisco (born 1995), American baseball catcher
- David Sisco (1937–2016), American NASCAR driver
- Gary Sisco, American government administrator, 29th Secretary of the United States Senate
- Jack Sisco (1904–1983), American football player, coach and official
- Jordan Sisco (born 1998), Canadian football player
- Joseph J. Sisco (1919–2004), American diplomat
- Kristina Sisco (born 1982), American writer and former actress
- Marideth Sisco (1943–2026), American storyteller, folklorist, singer-songwriter, author and retired journalist
- Tauna S. Sisco, American sociologist
- Sisco Gomez, stage name of English dancer and choreographer Francisco Gomez-Aspron (born 1985)

== Fictional characters ==
- Karen Sisco, a United States Marshal created by novelist Elmore Leonard, also appearing in a television series and the film Out of Sight
- From the television series Star Trek: Deep Space Nine:
  - Benjamin Sisko
  - Jake Sisko
  - Jennifer Sisko
  - Joseph Sisko

== See also ==
- Sisqó (born 1978), American R&B singer, songwriter, record producer, dancer and actor
- Gene Siskel (1946–1999), American film critic and journalist
- Cisco, a technology corporation
