= Rim Rock Drive =

- Rim Rock Drive Historic District
- U.S. National Register of Historic Places
- U.S. Historic district
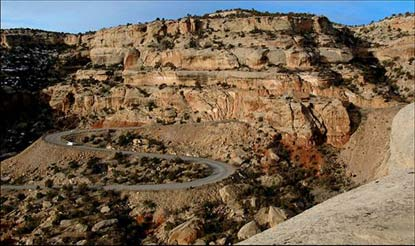

- Location within Colorado Location within the United States
- Nearest city: Grand Junction, Colorado
- Coordinates: 39°3′25″N 108°42′4″W
- Built: 1931
- MPS: Colorado National Monument MPS
- NRHP reference No.: 94000310
- Added to NRHP: April 21, 1994

Rim Rock Drive is a scenic road in Colorado National Monument. The 23-mile (37 km) drive follows the upper rim of a series of canyons, extending from the vicinity of Fruita, Colorado, in the west to near Grand Junction, Colorado, in the east, connecting points only 8 miles (13 km) miles apart in a straight line. The entire road has been designated a historic district on the National Register of Historic Places.

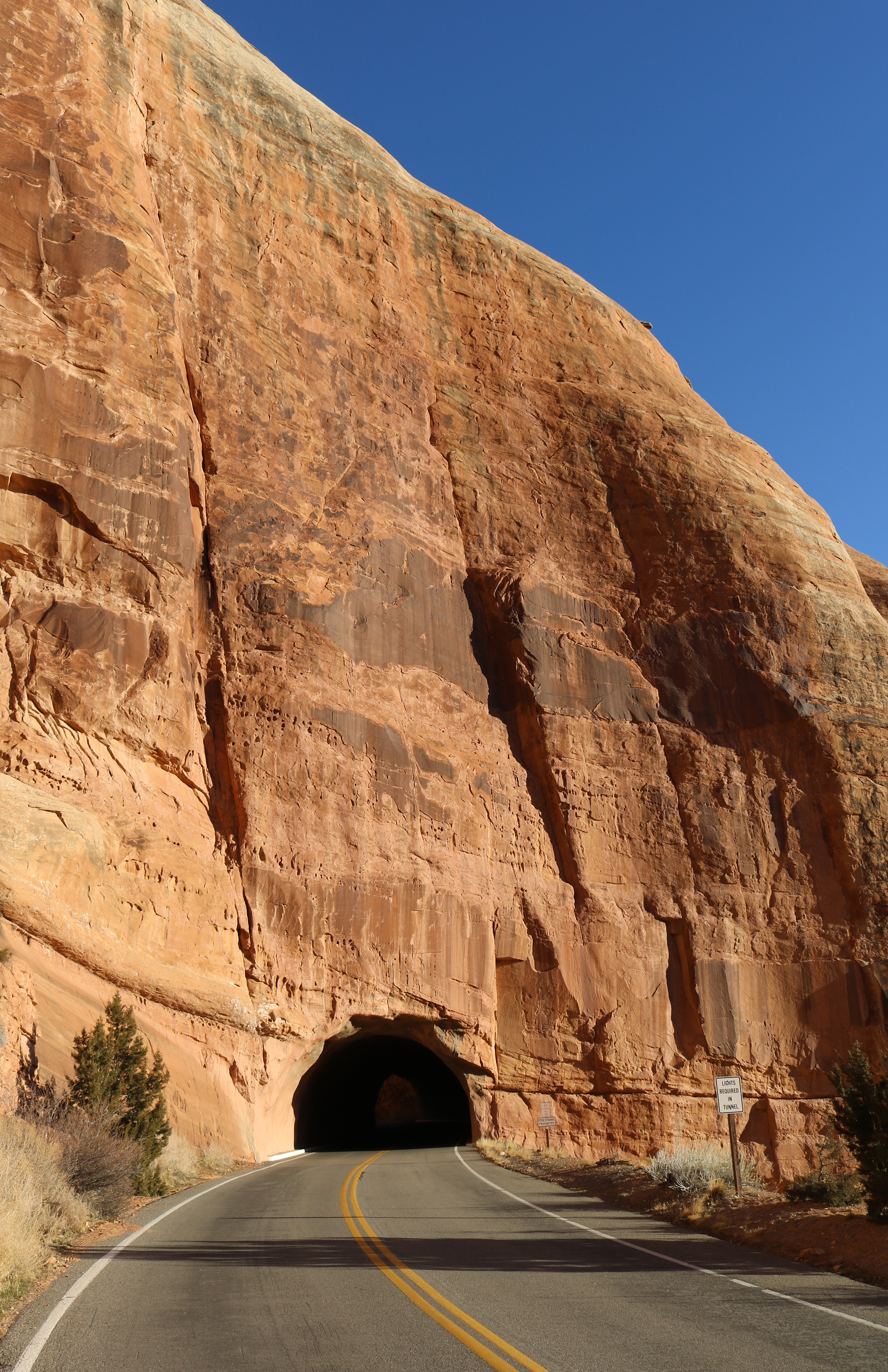
The west lower tunnel

The routing of the road was determined in November 1931 by National Park Service Engineer Thomas W. Secrest during a visit to the monument.

The detailed design for the road was developed in 1932 by the National Park Service Branch of Engineering and Branch of Plans and Design for maximum scenic impact, using the National Park Service Rustic style. Most of the road was constructed with almost entirely manual labor by labor from the Works Progress Administration, Public Works Administration, and Civilian Conservation Corps, and represents one of the most significant Depression-era public projects. Extensive drilling and blasting was required, and three tunnels were bored. Work was suspended by the Second World War from 1942 to 1948, and was finally completed in 1950. At its height, the project employed more than 800 men.
