= Harrison House =

Harrison House may refer to:

== Canada ==
- Harrison House (Fredericton), a university residence at the University of New Brunswick, Fredericton, New Brunswick, Canada

== United States ==
(by state then city)

- Sen. James A. Harrison House, Nogales, Arizona, listed on the National Register of Historic Places (NRHP) in Santa Cruz County, Arizona
- Harrison House (San Juan Capistrano, California), listed on the NRHP in Orange County, California
- Thomas Harrison House (Branford, Connecticut), NRHP-listed
- Harrison-Gibson House, Columbus, Georgia, listed on the NRHP in Muscogee County, Georgia
- William G. Harrison House, Nashville, Georgia, NRHP-listed
- Benjamin Harrison House, Indianapolis, Indiana, NRHP-listed
- Grouseland, William Henry Harrison Home, Vincennes, Indiana, a U.S. National Historic Landmark
- E. H. Harrison House, Keokuk, Iowa, NRHP-listed
- Fannie Harrison Farm, Elizabethtown, Kentucky, listed on the NRHP in Hardin County, Kentucky
- C. Lewis Harrison House, Newton, Massachusetts, NRHP-listed
- Samuel Harrison House, Pittsfield, Massachusetts, NRHP-listed
- Loop-Harrison Mansion, Port Sanilac, Michigan, NRHP-listed
- Harrison House (Fayette, Mississippi), a museum in Mississippi
- William Henry and Lilla Luce Harrison House, Cape Girardeau, Missouri, listed on the NRHP in Cape Girardeau County, Missouri
- Harrison Lake Patrol Cabin, Glacier National Park, Montana, listed on the NRHP in Flathead County, Montana
- Waborn (Wabe) and Sarah E. Harrison Ranch House, Greycliff, Montana, listed on the NRHP in Sweet Grass County, Montana
- Williams-Harrison House, Roseland, New Jersey, NRHP-listed
- Samuel Orton Harrison House, West Caldwell, New Jersey, NRHP-listed
- Edward Harrison House, Brockport, New York, listed on the NRHP in Monroe County, New York
- The Manor (Glen Cove, New York), formerly known as "Harrison House"
- Harrison Meeting House Site and Cemetery, Montgomery, New York, NRHP-listed
- Wallace K. Harrison Estate, West Hills, New York, NRHP-listed
- Gen. William Henry Harrison Headquarters, Columbus, Ohio, listed on the NRHP in Columbus, Ohio
- Harrison-Landers House, Newtown, Ohio, NRHP-listed
- Harrison House (Centerville, Pennsylvania), NRHP-listed
- Harrison House (Franklin, Tennessee), listed on the NRHP in Williamson County, Tennessee
- Harrison-Hastedt House, Columbus, Texas, listed on the NRHP in Colorado County, Texas
- John S. Harrison House, Selma, Texas, listed on the NRHP in Bexar County, Texas
- Gerard A. Harrison House, Wharton, Texas, listed on the NRHP in Wharton County, Texas
- Harrison-Dennis House, Wharton, Texas, listed on the NRHP in Wharton County, Texas
- Wood-Harrison House, Springville, Utah, NRHP-listed
- Daniel Harrison House, Dayton, Virginia, NRHP-listed
- Thomas Harrison House (Harrisonburg, Virginia), NRHP-listed

== See also ==
- Thomas Harrison House (disambiguation)
- Harrison Building (disambiguation)
