= National Register of Historic Places listings in Mesa County, Colorado =

Location of Mesa County in Colorado

This is a list of the National Register of Historic Places listings in Mesa County, Colorado.

This is intended to be a complete list of the properties and districts on the National Register of Historic Places in Mesa County, Colorado, United States. The locations of National Register properties and districts for which the latitude and longitude coordinates are included below, may be seen in a map.

There are 37 properties and districts listed on the National Register in the county. Another 2 properties were once listed but have been removed.

This National Park Service list is complete through NPS recent listings posted September 11, 2026.

== Current listings ==
	Name on the Register	Image	Date listed	Location	City or town	Description
1	Bloomfield Site		January 20, 1983 (#83001324)	Address Restricted	Whitewater	
2	Calamity Camp		June 1, 2011 (#11000313)	Address Restricted	Gateway	Mining Industry in Colorado MPS
3	Cayton Guard Station		April 27, 2005 (#05000335)	Forest Service Road 814.1; 39°18′20″N 107°33′53″W	Silt	Log cabin built in 1910 to serve National Forest rangers.
4	Clifton Community Center and Church	Clifton Community Center and Church	June 3, 1982 (#82002307)	F and Front St. 39°05′29″N 108°26′57″W	Clifton	The structure is two stories tall and features a raised basement on less than one acre of land.
5	Coates Creek Schoolhouse	Coates Creek Schoolhouse	February 3, 1993 (#92001839)	D S Rd., 16 miles (26 km) west of Glade Park; 38°56′55″N 108°58′35″W	Glade Park	One-room schoolhouse.
6	Colorado National Monument Visitor Center Complex	Colorado National Monument Visitor Center Complex	July 15, 2003 (#03000647)	Colorado National Monument; 39°06′07″N 108°43′50″W	Fruita	
7	Colorado River Bridge	Colorado River Bridge	October 15, 2002 (#02001154)	Interstate 70 frontage road at milepost 62.90; 39°20′20″N 108°11′36″W	De Beque	
8	Convicts' Bread Oven	Convicts' Bread Oven	December 31, 1974 (#74000589)	West of Molina on State Highway 65; 39°12′02″N 108°11′29″W	Molina	
9	Herbert and Edith Crissey House	Herbert and Edith Crissey House	May 18, 2003 (#03000402)	218 W. 1st St. 39°06′44″N 108°21′07″W	Palisade	
10	Cross Land and Fruit Company Orchards and Ranch	Cross Land and Fruit Company Orchards and Ranch	March 28, 1980 (#80000912)	Northeast of Grand Junction at 3079 F Rd. 39°05′28″N 108°28′52″W	Grand Junction	
11	De Beque House	De Beque House	July 28, 1995 (#95000936)	233 Denver Ave. 39°19′49″N 108°13′04″W	De Beque	
12	Denver and Rio Grande Western Railroad Depot	Denver and Rio Grande Western Railroad Depot	September 8, 1992 (#92001190)	119 Pitkin Ave. 39°03′51″N 108°34′09″W	Grand Junction	
13	Department of Energy Grand Junction Office	Department of Energy Grand Junction Office	July 26, 2016 (#16000470)	2591 Legacy Way; 39°02′31″N 108°34′21″W	Grand Junction	
14	Devils Kitchen Picnic Shelter	Devils Kitchen Picnic Shelter	April 21, 1994 (#94000309)	Colorado National Monument; 39°01′58″N 108°37′59″W	Grand Junction	
15	Fruita Bridge	Fruita Bridge	February 4, 1985 (#85000218)	17 1/2 Rd over the Colorado River; 39°08′13″N 108°43′50″W	Fruita	
16	Fruita Museum	Fruita Museum	October 10, 1996 (#96001080)	432 E. Aspen; 39°08′59″N 108°43′45″W	Fruita	
17	Grand Valley Diversion Dam	Grand Valley Diversion Dam	October 8, 1991 (#91001485)	Across the Colorado River north of its confluence with Plateau Creek, 8 miles (13 km) northeast of Palisade; 39°11′20″N 108°16′53″W	Palisade	
18	Handy Chapel	Handy Chapel	August 19, 1994 (#94001012)	202 White Ave. 39°04′10″N 108°34′07″W	Grand Junction	
19	Hotel St. Regis	Hotel St. Regis	October 22, 1992 (#92001410)	359 Colorado Ave. 39°03′58″N 108°33′56″W	Grand Junction	
20	IOOF Hall	IOOF Hall	March 25, 1993 (#93000200)	Junction of 4th St. and Curtis Ave. 39°20′00″N 108°12′51″W	De Beque	
21	Kettle-Jens House	Kettle-Jens House	May 6, 1983 (#83001325)	498 32 Rd. 39°04′37″N 108°27′31″W	Clifton	
22	Land's End Observatory	Land's End Observatory	February 28, 1997 (#97000124)	Land's End Rd., 10 miles (16 km) west of State Highway 65; 39°01′30″N 108°13′25″W	Whitewater	
23	Loma Community Hall	Loma Community Hall	November 22, 1995 (#95001338)	1341 13 Road; 39°11′56″N 108°48′47″W	Loma	
24	Margery Building	Margery Building	February 24, 1993 (#93000033)	519-527 Main St. 39°04′02″N 108°33′48″W	Grand Junction	
25	North Seventh Street Historic Residential District	North Seventh Street Historic Residential District	January 5, 1984 (#84000870)	7th St. between Hill and White Aves. 39°04′19″N 108°33′37″W	Grand Junction	
26	Harry and Lilly Phillips House	Harry and Lilly Phillips House	November 13, 1997 (#97001419)	798 N. Mesa St. 39°10′21″N 108°43′58″W	Fruita	
27	Pipe Line School	Pipe Line School	April 29, 1999 (#99000483)	101 16.5 S Rd. 38°59′50″N 108°44′27″W	Glade Park	
28	Rim Rock Drive Historic District	Rim Rock Drive Historic District	April 21, 1994 (#94000310)	Colorado National Monument; 39°03′25″N 108°42′04″W	Grand Junction	
29	Saddlehorn Caretaker's House and Garage	Saddlehorn Caretaker's House and Garage	April 21, 1994 (#94000306)	Colorado National Monument; 39°06′05″N 108°43′59″W	Grand Junction	
30	Saddlehorn Comfort Station	Saddlehorn Comfort Station	April 21, 1994 (#94000305)	Colorado National Monument; 39°06′17″N 108°44′23″W	Grand Junction	
31	Saddlehorn Recreation and Headquarters Historic District		June 12, 2026 (#100013109)	Colorado National Monument	Grand Junction	
32	Saddlehorn Utility Area Historic District	Saddlehorn Utility Area Historic District	April 21, 1994 (#94000308)	Colorado National Monument; 39°06′05″N 108°44′17″W	Grand Junction	
33	Serpents Trail	Serpents Trail	April 21, 1994 (#94000307)	Colorado National Monument; 39°01′53″N 108°38′11″W	Grand Junction	
34	Stranges Grocery	Stranges Grocery	March 20, 2013 (#13000079)	226 Pitkin Ave. 39°03′53″N 108°34′08″W	Grand Junction	
35	TBM Avenger Aircraft N53503	TBM Avenger Aircraft N53503	November 13, 2017 (#100001791)	CAF Rocky Mountain Wing Museum, 780 Heritage Way, Grand Junction Regional Airport; 39°07′04″N 108°31′31″W	Grand Junction	
36	U.S. Post Office	U.S. Post Office	January 31, 1980 (#80000913)	400 Rood Ave. 39°04′07″N 108°33′55″W	Grand Junction	
37	White Rocks		June 12, 2026 (#100013108)	Mouth of Gold Star Canyon at South Broadway; 39°05′28″N 108°41′25″W	Colorado National Monument	

== Former listings ==
	Name on the Register	Image	Date listed	Date removed	Location	City or town	Description
1	Black Bridge	Black Bridge	February 4, 1985 (#85000219)	July 22, 1994	25 3/10 Rd over the Gunnison River	Grand Junction	Damaged by flooding in 1983. Demolished in 1988.
2	Fifth Street Bridge	Fifth Street Bridge	February 4, 1985 (#85000220)	July 22, 1994	Northbound U.S. Highway 50 over the Colorado River	Grand Junction	Replaced in 1989.

== See also ==
- List of National Historic Landmarks in Colorado
- List of National Register of Historic Places in Colorado
- Bibliography of Colorado
- Geography of Colorado
- History of Colorado
- Index of Colorado-related articles
- List of Colorado-related lists
- Outline of Colorado
