= Colorado River Bridge =

Colorado River Bridge may refer to:

- Mike O'Callaghan – Pat Tillman Memorial Bridge, spanning the Colorado River just downstream of Hoover Dam
- Colorado River Bridge (De Beque, Colorado), listed on the National Register of Historic Places in Mesa County, Colorado
- Colorado River Bridge (Bastrop, Texas), also known as Old Iron Bridge, NRHP-listed in Bastrop County, Texas
- Colorado River Bridge (Wharton, Texas), NRHP-listed in Wharton County, Texas
