= Harrison Building =

Harrison Building may refer to:

- Himmelberger and Harrison Building, Cape Girardeau, Missouri, listed on the NRHP in Cape Girardeau County, Missouri
- Harrison Apartment Building, Washington, D.C., NRHP-listed

== See also ==
- Harrison House (disambiguation)
- Harrison County Courthouse (disambiguation)
- Harrison High School (disambiguation)
- Harrison School (disambiguation)
- Harris Building (disambiguation)
