= Harrison High School =

Harrison High School may refer to:

in the United States (by state)

- Harrison High School (Harrison, Arkansas), listed on the National Register of Historic Places
- Harrison High School (Colorado Springs) — Colorado Springs, Colorado
- Harrison High School (West Point, Georgia), high school for African Americans
- Harrison High School (Kennesaw, Georgia) — Kennesaw, Georgia
- Harrison Technical High School, Former High school – in Chicago, Illinois
- William Henry Harrison High School (Evansville, Indiana) — Evansville, Indiana
- North Harrison High School (Indiana) — Ramsey, Indiana
- William Henry Harrison High School (Tippecano, Indiana) — West Lafayette, Indiana postal address
- West Harrison High School — Mondamin, Iowa
- Harrison County High School — Cynthiana, Kentucky
- Harrison High School (Michigan) — Farmington Hills, Michigan
- Harrison Community High School — Harrison, Michigan
- Harrison Central High School — Lyman, Mississippi
- Harrison Central High School — Gulfport, Mississippi
- North Harrison High School (Missouri) — Eagleville, Missouri
- South Harrison High School (Missouri) — Bethany, Missouri
- Harrison High School (Montana) — Harrison, Montana
- Harrison High School (New Jersey) — Harrison, New Jersey
- Harrison High School (New York) — Harrison, New York
- Harrison Central High School — Cadiz, Ohio
- William Henry Harrison High School (Ohio) — Harrison, Ohio
- South Harrison High School (West Virginia) — Lost Creek, West Virginia

== See also ==
- Harrison School (disambiguation)
