= Justin Walley (American football) =

American football player (born 2002)

No. 27 – Indianapolis Colts
- Position: Cornerback
- Roster status: Active

Personal information
- Born: September 22, 2002 (age 24)
- Listed height: 5 ft 10 in (1.78 m)
- Listed weight: 190 lb (86 kg)

Career information
- High school: D'Iberville (D'Iberville, Mississippi)
- College: Minnesota (2021–2024)
- NFL draft: 2025: 3rd round, 80th overall pick

Career history
- Indianapolis Colts (2025–present)

Awards and highlights
- Second-team All-Big Ten (2024)

Career NFL statistics as of Week 11, 2026
- Tackles: 45
- Pass deflections: 5
- Forced fumbles: 3
- Sacks: 2.0
- Stats at Pro Football Reference

Justin Walley (born September 22, 2002) is an American professional football cornerback for the Indianapolis Colts of the National Football League (NFL). He played college football for the Minnesota Golden Gophers and was selected by the Colts in the third round of the 2025 NFL draft.

== Early life ==
Walley attended D'Iberville High School in D'Iberville, Mississippi. As a junior, he notched 74 tackles, seven pass deflections, and an interception, while also hauling in 230 receiving yards. Coming out of high school, Walley was rated as a three-star recruit and committed to playing college football for the Minnesota Golden Gophers over offers from schools such as Baylor, Colorado, Mississippi State, and Ole Miss.

== College career ==
In the 2021 regular season finale, Walley recorded an interception in a win over rival Wisconsin. He finished the season with 29 tackles, seven pass deflections, an interception, a forced fumble, two fumble recoveries, and a touchdown. In 2022, Walley recorded 39 tackles, two pass deflections, three interceptions, a fumble recovery and a forced fumble. In the 2023 season opener, he forced a fumble with less than five minutes left which helped Minnesota come back and beat Nebraska. During the 2023 season, Walley tallied 46 tackles, eight pass deflections, an interception, a fumble recovery and a forced fumble. In 2024, Walley's senior season, he returned an interception 70 yards in the season opening game against North Carolina. Later in the season, he returned an interception for 32 yards and a touchdown against Maryland. In all, he finished the season with 42 tackles, one sack, two interceptions, and a career high 10 passes defended.

== Professional career ==
Pre-draft measurables
Height	Weight	Arm length	Hand span	Wingspan	40-yard dash	10-yard split	20-yard split	20-yard shuttle	Three-cone drill	Vertical jump	Broad jump
5 ft 10 1/8 in (1.78 m)	190 lb (86 kg)	30 3/4 in (0.78 m)	10 in (0.25 m)	6 ft 2 7/8 in (1.90 m)	4.40 s	1.52 s	2.57 s	4.36 s	7.01 s	32.0 in (0.81 m)	10 ft 0 in (3.05 m)
All values from NFL Combine/Pro Day

Walley was selected by the Indianapolis Colts with the 80th pick in the third round of the 2025 NFL draft. He signed a four-year contract with the Colts on May 9, 2025. He suffered a torn ACL in training camp and was placed on injured reserve on August 8.

In Week 10 of the 2026 season against the Miami Dolphins, Walley posted five tackles, two for a loss, two passes defensed, a sack and a forced fumble in the Colts' 24-22 victory, earning him AFC Defensive Player of the Week.

== Personal life ==
Walley is the cousin of former NFL cornerback, Dee McCann. His older brother Jaden is a wide receiver for the Mississippi State Bulldogs.
