= Harrison Home =

Harrison Home may refer to:

- Grouseland, home of William Henry Harrison
- Benjamin Harrison Home, home of Benjamin Harrison
- Harrison House (Fredericton), university residence at University of New Brunswick
