= Harrison Central High School (Mississippi) =

Coordinates: 30°30′57″N 89°6′8″W

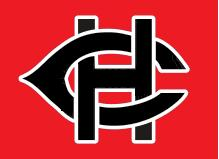

Location
- 15600 School Road; Gulfport, Mississippi 39503; United States

Information
- Type: Public
- Established: 1957
- School district: Harrison County School District
- Superintendent: William Bentz
- Principal: Rachel Burt
- Staff: 82.73 (FTE)
- Grades: 9–12
- Enrollment: 1,508 (2023–2024)
- Student to teacher ratio: 18.23
- Color
- Mascot: Red Rebel
- Accreditation: Southern Association of Colleges and Schools
- Yearbook: ”The Rebel”
- Website: hch.harrison.k12.ms.us

Harrison Central High School is a 7A public high school located near Lyman, Mississippi, United States. As of the 2023-24 school year, it has a student body of 1,508. The principal is Rachel Burt.

== History ==
In 1957, Harrison County consolidated several community-based high schools to create Harrison Central High School on the present-day Lyman Elementary Campus of Harrison County School District. As the community grew, a new Harrison Central High School was constructed in 1967. The new campus houses grades 9-12. To help with overcrowding at this campus, the school district built West Harrison High School in 2008 in western Harrison County, MS.

== Academics and Courses ==
Harrison Central provides students with numerous opportunities with both Advanced Placement Courses and also Dual Credit Courses in partnership at the nearby Harrison County Campus for Mississippi Gulf Coast Community College (MGCCC). Similarly, students can also enroll in Collegiate Academy to earn up to 60 hours of college credit, allowing for students to graduate with an associate degree.

Students can also apply and participate in the on-campus Harrison County Career & Technical Education Center. Students can apply during their sophomore or junior year and must continue the program for 2 years. The Center services students from the nearby West Harrison and D'Iberville high schools, meaning Harrison Central students can work with peers from different high schools. Vocational programs offered include Automotive Technology; Business, Marketing, and Finance; Construction and Carpentry; Engineering and Robotics; Health Science; Precision Machining; Teacher Academy; and Welding. Students enrolled can also qualify for membership in the National Technical Honor Society chapter after completing their first year.

== Extracurricular activities ==
=== Clubs/Organizations ===
==== Band Program ====
Harrison Central High School's Band has earned Straight Superior Ratings for the past 35 years, along with many national and international achievements. This has led to it being called the "Pride of the Coast". As of 2014, the band is under the direction of Ken White, Wil Richmond, Kristina Havard, Jeremy Smith and Dwight Hollingsworth. The band has multiple programs that include marching, concert, symphonic, winter guard and indoor percussion. At the 2015 MHSAA Concert Band Evaluations, they scored an overall 1 on stage, 2 in sight reading, and 1 in marching.

==== U.S. Army Junior ROTC ====
The JROTC "Red Rebel" Battalion, as of the 2020–21 school year, has approximately 50 cadets who learn the value of citizenship, leadership, community service, and teamwork. JROTC is also involved in competition with its Color Guard team, Exhibition Drill Team, Regulation Drill Team, and an Adventure Training Team (Raider Team or Elite). Each team competes in a variety of events; for instance, the Regulation Drill Team competes in unarmed squad, unarmed platoon, armed squad, and armed platoon. It was the only team from the state to reach nationals in the 2020 College Options Foundation's JROTC Leadership and Academic Bowl.

==== Student Council ====
The Student Council is composed of four separate class councils and one executive council. The student council consists of representatives of each class in school. Each council, including the executive council, has its own set of officers, representatives, and aides. The council, with their sponsors, help promote the general welfare of the school. The principal works closely with the executive president in the area of the student government and affairs. The student council's main duties are to plan and produce many school functions including the prom and homecoming dances. The student council is also responsible for designing class “apparel”, such as t-shirts and jackets.

==== National Honor Society ====
The National Honor Society (NHS) is an organization that recognizes the achievement and intellect of juniors and seniors at Harrison Central High School who not only excel in their classes, but also demonstrate the characteristics of scholarship, character, leadership, and service. Membership is by invitation only for Juniors and Seniors. Every year the NHS participates in many service projects such as the Mississippi Coastal Cleanup, Salvation Army Blood Drive, and an “Unsung Heroes” luncheon for the uncertified staff of HCHS. Each student is required to complete 20 hours of community service, not including chapter service projects, in order to remain a member of the society. Seniors are rewarded at graduation with a distinguished, light blue stole. Members also receive the NHS emblem on their diploma.

==== Mu Alpha Theta ====
Mu Alpha Theta is a nationwide mathematics honor society for high school and two-year college students, with the purpose of furthering the understanding of mathematics, as well as encouraging study in the field. Each year, the Harrison Central chapter participates in state-wide competitions and conventions. Membership requires a minimum of Algebra II and proficiency in all math classes taken. Students also have the chance to serve as president, vice-president, Secretary, or Treasurer.

==== DECA ====
DECA prepares students for a career in marketing, management, and entrepreneurship by instilling the basic principles of business and leadership. DECA is open to all students (10th-12th grade) enrolled in the Marketing Management Technology course at the Harrison County Career and Tech Center located on the HCHS campus. Members use their marketing skills to compete in role-play situations at the district, state, and international level. DECA offers many competitive events, ranging from Sports & Entertainment marketing to Apparel and Accessories Marketing. Members can compete individually or in teams of up to four members. DECA gives many students the opportunity to travel to places such as New York, Orlando, and Anaheim.

==== FBLA-PBL ====
Future Business Leaders of America-Phi Beta Lambda (FBLA-PBL) is one of the largest student-run organization in the United States of America, with 253,365 members, and the largest career student organization in the world. Students at Harrison Central can partake in the organization when enrolled in Business at the Harrison County Career and Tech Center on campus. Members can compete in events, such as the Future Business Leaders of American Southern District Leadership Conference.

=== Athletics ===
==== Sports programs ====
Harrison Central is home to a wide variety of sports, including but not limited to: archery, baseball, basketball, bowling, cross country, football, golf, powerlifting, soccer, softball, tennis, track, and volleyball. Its selection of teams has achieved many honors like South State Softball Champions, Boys Cross Country District Champions, Boys Basketball State Champions, Girls Basketball Champions, Girls and Boys Powerlifting Champions, and many other competitive teams.

==== Cheerleading ====
The school spirit squad has won over twenty state cheerleading titles through MHSAA (Mississippi High School Activities Association). They have been ranked Third, Fourth, Fifth, Seventh, and Eighth place at several UCA National High School Cheerleading Championships. The squad won its first national title after competing at the Mardi Gras Nationals of 2001 in the Coed Division.

== Notable alumni ==
- Timmy Bowers, professional basketball player, 2006 Israeli Basketball Premier League MVP
- Bobby Bradley, baseball player in the Cleveland Guardians organization
- Billy Hewes, mayor of Gulfport, Mississippi 2013 to 2025
- Greg Hibbard, former Major League Baseball pitcher
- Diane Ladd, actress
- Matt Lawton, former Major League Baseball outfielder
