= Harrison School =

Harrison School may refer to:

in Australia

- perhaps there is a school in Harrison, Australian Capital Territory?

in the United States

- Harrison High School (disambiguation), any one of numerous schools in many states

Or, (by state):

- Harrison School (St. Louis, Missouri), NRHP-listed
- William H. Harrison School, Philadelphia, PA, listed on the NRHP in North Philadelphia, Pennsylvania
- Harrison School (Roanoke, Virginia), listed on the NRHP in Roanoke, Virginia

== See also ==
- Harrison High School (disambiguation)
- Harrison Building (disambiguation)
