= Jaden Walley =

American football player (born 2001)

No. 11 – Mississippi State Bulldogs
- Position: Wide receiver
- Class: Senior

Personal information
- Born: September 13, 2001 (age 25)
- Listed height: 6 ft 0 in (1.83 m)
- Listed weight: 195 lb (88 kg)

Career information
- High school: D'Iberville (D'Iberville, Mississippi)
- College: Mississippi State (2020–2024)
- Stats at ESPN

Jaden Malik Walley (born September 13, 2001) is an American college football wide receiver for the Mississippi State Bulldogs.

== Early life ==
Walley grew up in D'Iberville, Mississippi and attended D'Iberville High School where he lettered in football and baseball. In his high school career, Walley completed 68 of his 165 pass attempts for 1,162 yards, 18 touchdowns and four interceptions. Walley would also rush for 2,157 yards and 32 touchdowns, while also hauling in 19 receptions for 476 yards. Walley was a three-star rated recruit and would decide to commit to play college football at Mississippi State University over offers from Air Force, Arkansas, Auburn, Ole Miss, South Alabama, Southern Miss and Vanderbilt.

== College career ==
During Walley's true freshman season in 2020, he appeared in all 11 games and started eight of them. He finished the season with 52 catches for 718 yards and two touchdowns. During the 2021 season, he played in all 13 games and started 10 of them, finishing the season with 628 receiving yards and six touchdowns on 55 catches averaging 48.3 receiving yards per game and 11.4 per catch. During the 2022 season, he appeared in 13 games and started seven of them, finishing the season with 34 receptions for 348 yards and three touchdowns averaging 27.8 yards per game. During the 2023 season, he appeared in 10 games and started two of them, finishing the season with five receptions for 49 yards and one touchdown with four of his receptions going for a first down. He was limited due to injuries.

== Personal life ==
Walley is the cousin of former NFL cornerback, Dee McCann. His younger brother Justin is a cornerback for the Indianapolis Colts.
