= Coates Creek Schoolhouse =

- U.S. National Register of Historic Places
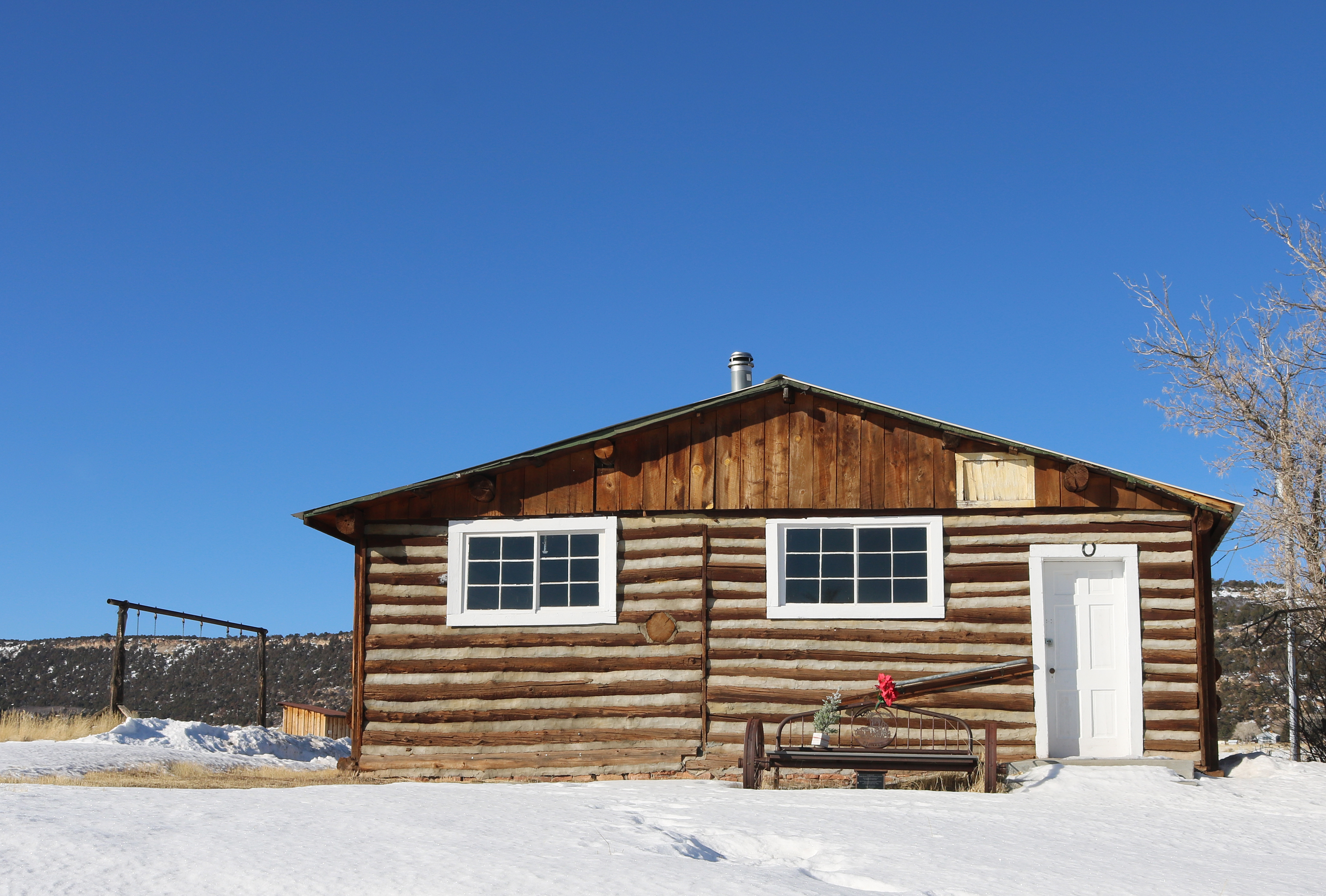
- The school in 2020
- Location: D S Rd., west of Glade Park, Colorado
- Coordinates: 38°56′55″N 108°58′35″W
- Area: less than one acre
- Built: 1919
- Built by: Brouse, Elwood
- Architectural style: Pioneer log
- MPS: Rural School Buildings in Colorado MPS
- NRHP reference No.: 92001839
- Added to NRHP: February 3, 1993

The Coates Creek Schoolhouse is a historic one-room log schoolhouse in rural Mesa County, Colorado, on a county road known as DS Road, about 16 miles (26 km) west of the hamlet of Glade Park, Colorado. It was listed on the National Register of Historic Places in 1993.

It is a log structure built in 1919 by local homesteader Elwood Brouse. It was used as a school from 1919 to 1971 and was used for church services and Sunday school until 1985.

After the road was relocated, the school was dismantled and moved in 1926 about 1.5 miles (2.4 km) southwest to its current location, where the new road crosses Coates Creek. It was expanded somewhat when rebuilt but was still one room. In 1942 it was expanded by the addition of a cloakroom and the interior was lined with plywood.
