= Dee McCann =

American gridiron football player (born 1983)

No. 32, 41
- Position: Cornerback

Personal information
- Born: April 24, 1983 (age 43); Lucedale, Mississippi, U.S.
- Listed height: 5 ft 11 in (1.80 m)
- Listed weight: 198 lb (90 kg)

Career information
- High school: Leakesville (MS) Greene County
- College: West Virginia
- NFL draft: 2006: 6th round, 179th overall pick

Career history
- Detroit Lions (2006); Minnesota Vikings (2007–2008)*; Calgary Stampeders (2009)*
- * Offseason or practice squad member only

Alton "Dee" McCann (born April 24, 1983) is an American former professional football cornerback. He was selected by the Detroit Lions in the sixth round of the 2006 NFL draft. He played college football for the West Virginia Mountaineers. McCann was also a member of the Minnesota Vikings and Calgary Stampeders.

== Early life ==
McCann attended Greene County High School in Leakesville, Mississippi and was a student and a letterman in football. In football, he was an All-District selection as a running back.

== College career ==
Before attending West Virginia University, he attended Jones County Junior College in Ellisville, Mississippi. McCann tallied up 72 tackles, five sacks, and three interceptions in 2003 at Jones, where he earned all-state and all-JUCO honors.

McCann transferred to WVU in 2004, where he played cornerback throughout the season with All-American Pacman Jones. McCann only recorded 21 tackles for the season, but saw his first significant action against Virginia Tech, where he recorded two tackles against the Virginia Tech Hokies. With Pacman Jones out due to injury against Rutgers, McCann started. Against the Scarlet Knights, McCann recorded an interception, fumble recovery, two forced fumbles, and eight tackles. In the Gator Bowl against the Florida State Seminoles, McCann grabbed two interceptions and recorded six tackles.

In his senior year of 2005, McCann finally took starting positions with Pacman Jones leaving for the pro draft. McCann ended the season ranked third on the Mountaineers with 64 tackles, two interceptions, and five pass break-ups. Along with safeties Mike Lorello and Jahmile Addae, McCann and the Mountaineers posted an 11–1 record after the 2006 Sugar Bowl win against the Georgia Bulldogs. McCann had an important fumble recovery in the first quarter of the 38–35 win.

== Professional career ==
Pre-draft measurables
Height	Weight	Arm length	Hand span	40-yard dash	10-yard split	20-yard split	20-yard shuttle	Three-cone drill	Vertical jump	Broad jump
5 ft 11 1/4 in (1.81 m)	197 lb (89 kg)	29 7/8 in (0.76 m)	8 1/2 in (0.22 m)	4.53 s	1.59 s	2.65 s	4.38 s	7.35 s	40.5 in (1.03 m)	10 ft 2 in (3.10 m)
All values from NFL Combine

=== Detroit Lions ===
Dee McCann was selected 179th overall in the sixth round by the Detroit Lions. McCann stayed on their roster until September 2, 2006, when he was released to the practice squad.

=== Minnesota Vikings ===
In the 2007 Minnesota Vikings preseason, against the Cleveland Browns, McCann record his first stats of his pre-season career: two tackles. On January 6, 2008, following the end of the regular season, McCann was signed to a contract from the practice squad, but was soon released afterwards.

=== Calgary Stampeders ===
McCann signed with the Calgary Stampeders on May 12, 2009. He was released by the Stampeders on June 23.

== Personal life ==
McCann has two cousins who are also football players. Justin Walley is a cornerback for the Indianapolis Colts in the NFL, and Jaden Walley is a wide receiver for the Mississippi State Bulldogs.
