= Harrison County School District =

School district in Mississippi, United States

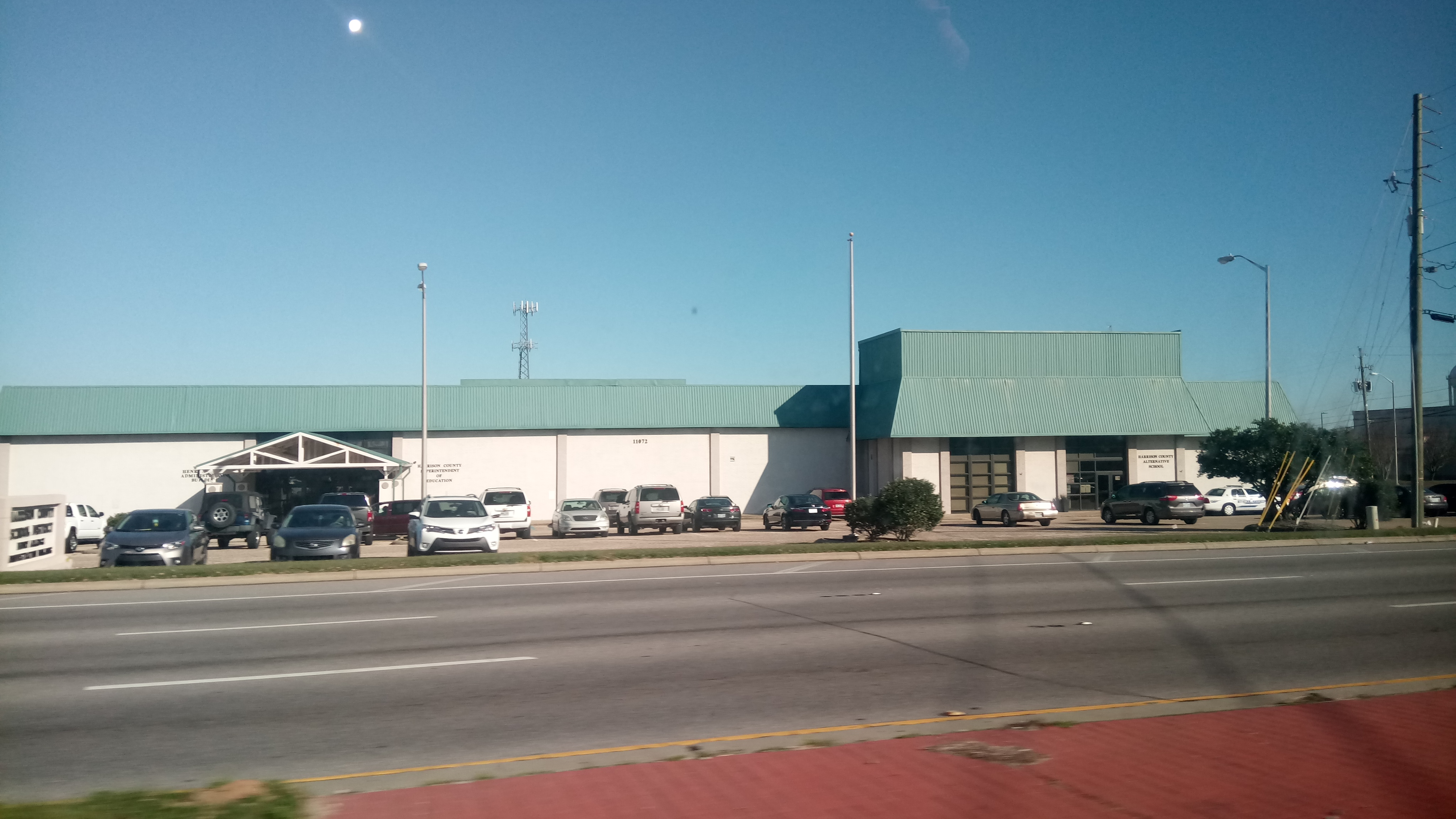
- School district headquarters

Location
- Gulfport, Mississippi United States
- Coordinates: 30.5611°N 89.1325°W

District information
- Type: Public
- Grades: K-12
- Established: 1957; 68 years ago
- Superintendent: William Bentz
- Accreditation: Southern Association of Colleges and Schools
- Enrollment: 14,780

Other information
- Website: www.harrison.k12.ms.us

The Harrison County School District is a public school district based in Gulfport, Mississippi, United States.

In addition to serving portions of Gulfport and Biloxi, the district also serves the city of D'Iberville, the communities of Lizana, Lyman, Pineville, Saucier and Woolmarket, as well as most of rural Harrison County.

== History ==
The Harrison County School District was created in 1957 as a result of a statewide reorganization plan passed into law by Mississippi Legislature. Districts coming together to form the new district were Pineville, Lyman, Orange Grove, Turkey Creek, North Gulfport, Woolmarket, D'Iberville, Saucier, Lizana and parts of the Dedeaux and the Sellers district. Past superintendents include R.L. Ladner, Esco Smith, R.D. "Bobby" Ladner, Henry Arledge, Roy Gill, and Mitchell King. William Bentz, appointed in 2024, is the district's current superintendent.

Beginning in July 2023, the district began requiring students to wear clothing that matches the gender norms of the genders that they are designated as in the school computer system. According to The Advocate, this infringes on transgender students.

== District Administration ==
=== Superintendent ===
- Mitchell King (2021-)

=== School Board ===
- Steven Ramsey, District I Board Member
- Betty Daniel, District II Board Member
- David Ladner, District III Board Member
- Dr. Barbara Thomas, District IV Board Member
- Eric Simmons, District V Board Member

== Schools ==
=== Elementary/Middle Schools (Grades K-8) ===
- Bel-Aire Elementary School (K-6)
- Creekbend Elementary & Middle School (K-8)
- Crossroads Elementary School (K-6)
- D'Iberville Elementary School (K-3)
- D'Iberville Middle School (4-8)
- Harrison Central Elementary School (K-3)
- Lizana Elementary School (K-6)
- Lyman Elementary School (K-6)
- North Gulfport Elementary/Middle School (K-8)
- North Woolmarket Elementary/Middle School (K-8)
- Orange Grove Elementary School (4-6)
- Pineville Elementary School (K-6)
- River Oaks Elementary School (K-6)
- Saucier Elementary School (K-6)
- Three Rivers Elementary School (K-6)
- West Harrison Middle School (7-8)
- West Wortham Elementary/Middle School (K-8)
- Woolmarket Elementary School (K-6)

=== High Schools (Grades 9-12) ===
- D'Iberville High School
- Harrison Central High School
- West Harrison High School

== Demographics ==
=== 2022-2023 school year ===
There were a total of 14,355 students enrolled in the Harrison County School District during the 2022-2023 school year. The gender makeup of the district was 48.5% female and 51.5% male. The racial makeup of the district was 33.9% African American, 48.7% White, 7.1% Hispanic, 2.6% Asian, 0.41% Native American, 0.36% Native Hawaiian or Pacific Islander, and 6.9% Two or More Races. 71.4% of the district's students participate in the federal free and reduced price meal program.

=== Previous school years ===
School Year	Enrollment	Gender Makeup		Racial Makeup						
School Year	Enrollment	Female	Male	Asian	Hispanic	African American	White	Multiracial	Alaskan Indian / Native American	Native Hawaiian / Pacific Islander
2022-23	14,355	6,962	7,393	370	1,025	4,861	6,995	993	59	52
2021-22	14,318	6,972	7,346	371	954	4,822	7,176	907	46	42
2020-21	13,666	6,688	6,978	364	877	4,752	6,822	767	42	42
2019-20	14780	7190	7590	370	889	5116	7608	706	46	45
2018-19	15010	7221	7789	382	792	5232	7875	649	42	38
2017-18	14904	7201	7703	387	681	5112	8050	589	43	42
2016-17	14773	7142	7631	385	657	4951	8178	525	40	37
2015-16	14628	7086	7542	433	640	4901	8413	117	35	29
2014-15	14472	7047	7425	432	536	4689	8580	168	41	26
2013-14	14168	6835	7333	455	465	4497	8675	*	74	*
2012-13	14037	6773	7264	457	436	4392	8663	*	57	*
2011-12	13861	6734	7127	453	418	4197	8738	*	36	*

* = Data Unavailable

== Accountability statistics ==
	2006-07	2005-06	2004-05	2003-04	2002-03
District Accreditation Status	Accredited	Accredited	Accredited	Accredited	Accredited
School Performance Classifications
Level 5 (Superior Performing) Schools	6	8	6	8	2
Level 4 (Exemplary) Schools	4	8	9	6	5
Level 3 (Successful) Schools	7	1	2	3	6
Level 2 (Under Performing) Schools	0	0	0	0	3
Level 1 (Low Performing) Schools	0	0	0	0	0
Not Assigned	0	0	0	0	1

== See also ==
- List of school districts in Mississippi
