= Old First Methodist Episcopal Church South =

Historic church in Texas, United States

- U.S. National Register of Historic Places
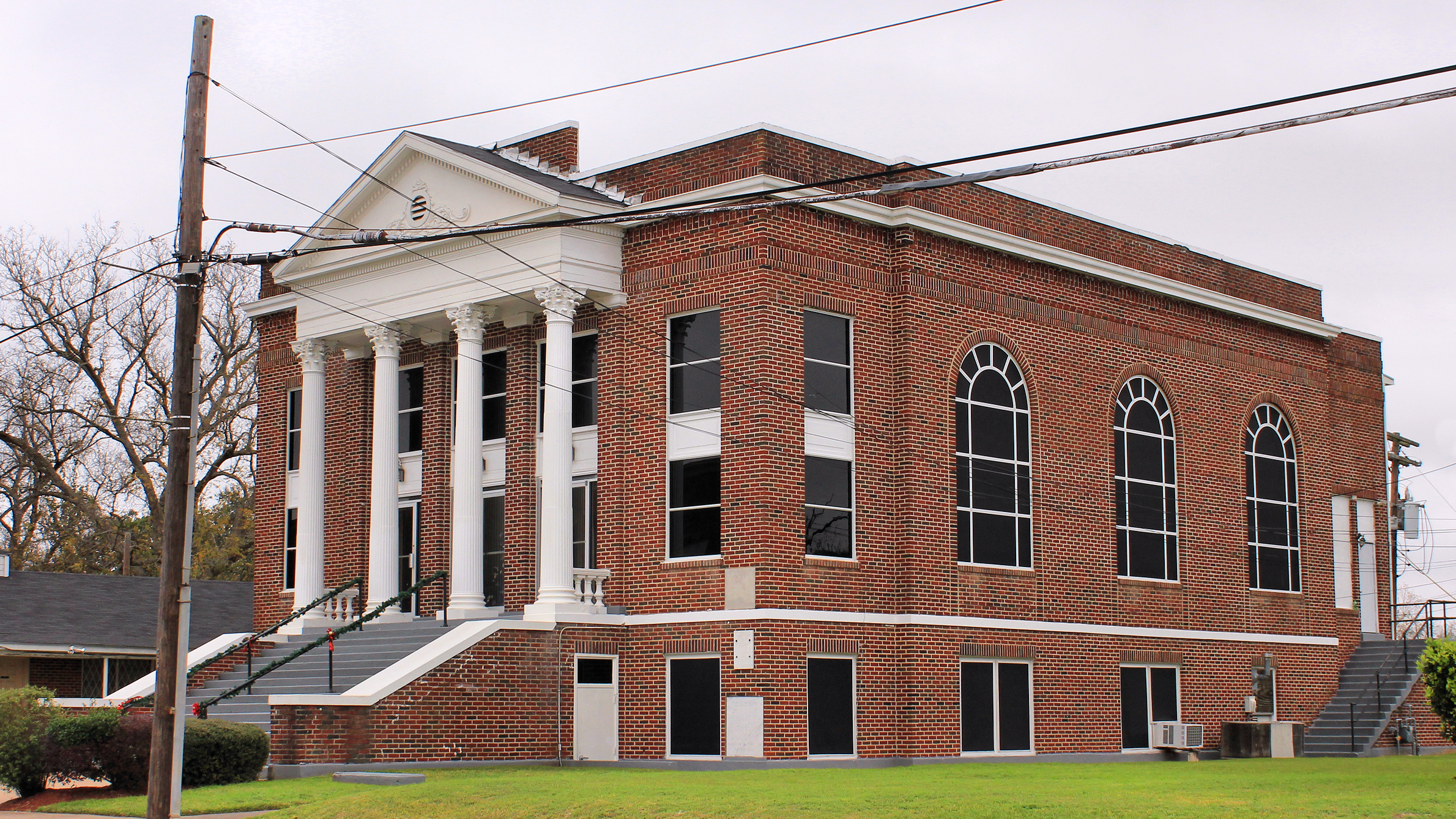
- Old First Methodist Episcopal Church South in 2015

- Location within Texas Location within the United States
- Location: 200 N. Fulton, Wharton, Texas
- Coordinates: 29°18′45″N 96°5′55″W
- Area: less than one acre
- Built: 1927
- Architectural style: Classical Revival
- MPS: Wharton MPS
- NRHP reference No.: 93000097
- Added to NRHP: March 18, 1993

Old First Methodist Episcopal Church South is a historic church at 200 N. Fulton in Wharton, Texas.

It was built in 1927 and added to the National Register in 1993.

== See also ==
- National Register of Historic Places listings in Wharton County, Texas
