= Thomas Harrison House =

Thomas Harrison House may refer to:

- Thomas Harrison House (Branford, Connecticut), listed on the NRHP in Connecticut
- Thomas Harrison House (Harrisonburg, Virginia), listed on the NRHP in Virginia

== See also ==
- Harrison House (disambiguation)
