= Handy Chapel =

Historic church in Colorado, United States

Coordinates: 39.0694°N 108.5693°W

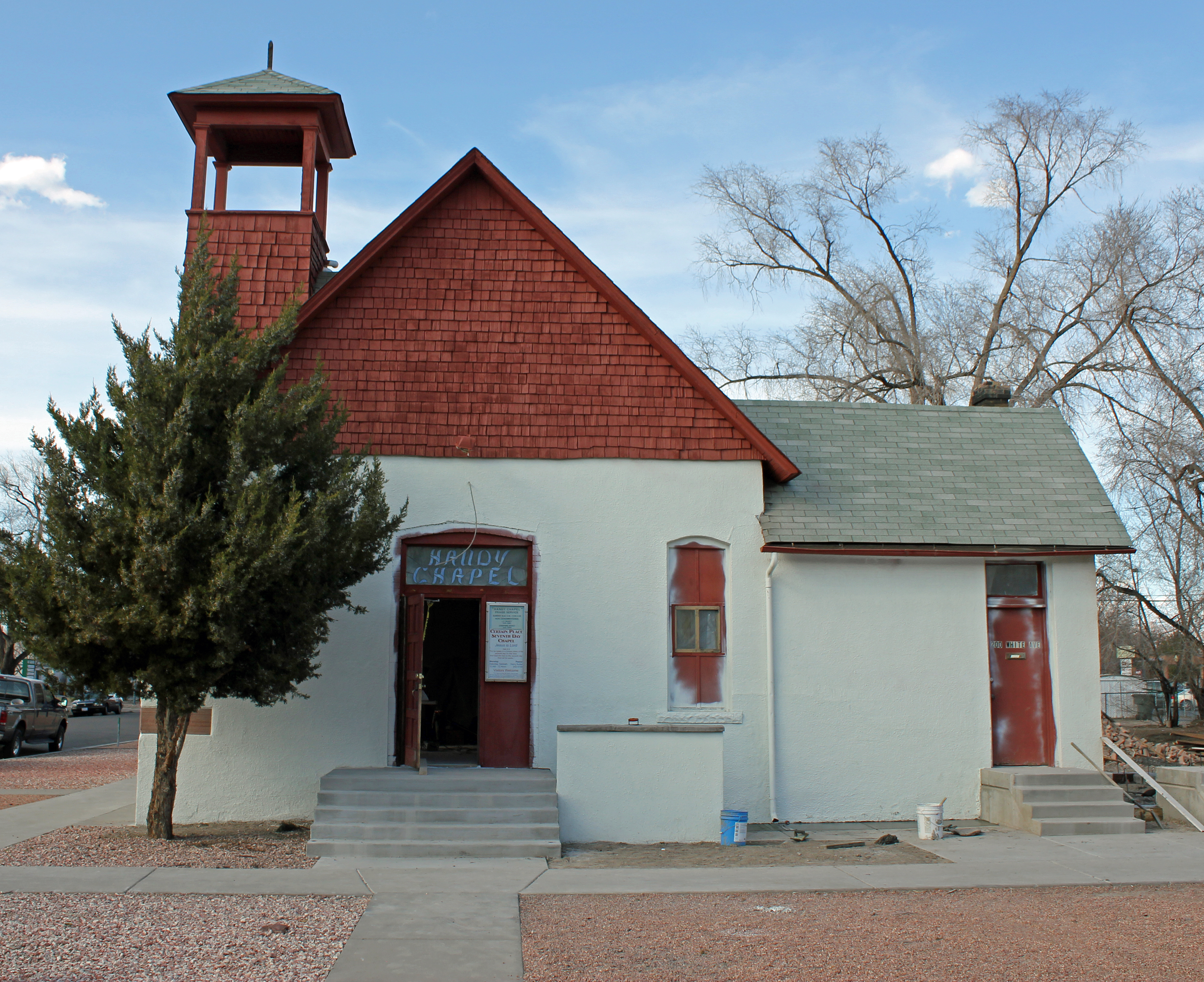
Handy Chapel, located at 202 White Avenue in Grand Junction, Colorado. The property is listed on the National Register of Historic Places.

Handy Chapel is the only original church building still standing in the original square mile of Grand Junction, Colorado. The land that the chapel was built on was deeded to "the black citizens of Grand Junction" for the express purpose of building a place of worship in 1883, just two short years after Grand Junction was originally staked out by town founder and Governor George A. Crawford. It took the African American community nine years to raise the required $962.50 to build the church, which was completed in 1892.

The chapel was added to the National Register of Historic Places in 1994.
