= Clifton Community Center and Church =

Historic church in Colorado, United States

- U.S. National Register of Historic Places
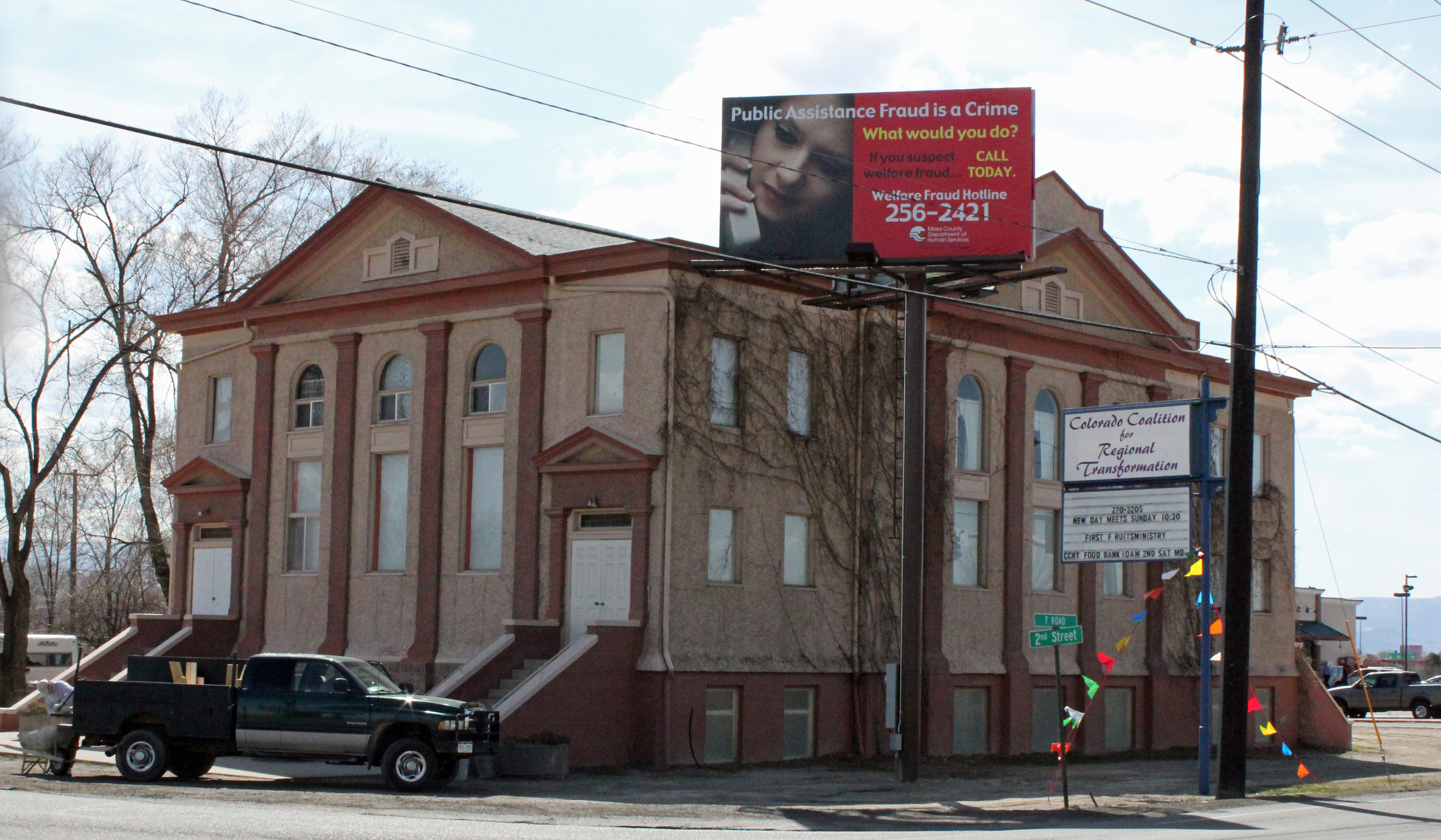
- The property in 2013.

- Location within Colorado Location within the United States
- Location: F and Main St., Clifton, Colorado
- Coordinates: 39°5′29″N 108°26′57″W
- Area: less than one acre
- Built: 1920
- Built by: Reverend Clark Bower
- NRHP reference No.: 82002307
- Added to NRHP: June 3, 1982

The Clifton Community Center and Church is a historic church in Mesa County, Colorado. It is located at the corner of F and Main Street in Clifton, Colorado, a town approximately five miles east of Grand Junction, Colorado.

== History ==
=== Origins and Construction ===
The structure was built in 1920 under the supervision of Reverend Clark Bower, who had formed the Christian Church in 1910. The church was important to the area as it hosted many of the local events. The church is specifically designed for this purpose; to be large enough for both religious meetings and for community events. The center was used for religious meetings, theater productions, harvest festivals, and all local school graduations (as there were no school auditoriums in Clifton in those days). The center was also utilized by local politicians to make speeches, as they knew they would have a large majority of the local community gathered there to hear their messages.

=== Fundraiser ===
On January 19, 1921, a fundraiser was held for the church to pay off the debt incurred by the construction of the structure. In total, members of the congregation and local community raised $34,000. This was a major achievement for a community not known for a great deal of wealth. News of this accomplishment traveled around Mesa County. $34,000 in 1921 when adjusted for inflation would be the equivalent of $487,005 in 2020.

Reverend Clark Bower went on to pursue a political career, serving in 1939 as Chaplain of the Colorado House of Representatives.

Clifton Community Center and Church was added to the National Register of Historic Places on June 3, 1982 for its architectural, religious, and political significance.

== Architecture ==
The structure is built upon less than one acre of land. It is two stories tall and features a raised basement. The main hall and balcony of the interior has a capacity to seat upwards of 600 occupants, although the congregation rarely reached much more than 100 members.

When describing Clifton Community Center and Church, Pat Knight of the US National Park Service stated:

″The church is approximately 4000 square feet on the main floor, 4000 on the basement floor and 2000 in the balcony. It has a cross^-gabled roof with plain boxed cornice roof trim on the front and back gables, and decorated side gables. The decorative head above the upper floor doors is double recessed paneled with a plain pediment above each. The staircases leading to the doors have concrete railings. The four doors leading to the basement floor are located below the staircases. Twelve windows, three on each facade, are arcaded with the original stained, leaded glass and hinged openings. The forty remaining windows have plain glass with hinged openings. The exterior walls consist of mesh metal lathe covered with a stucco mixture of cinder and cement which has been preserved remarkably well in its original state for the past sixty years. The interior of the building is spacious with lathe plastered walls and hard wood floors. In the auditorium, the balcony is semi-circular and has room for two rows of chairs. At the left of the pulpit is the baptistry which was built to be plainly viewed from the seating area. The basement is complete with kitchen serving tables and cupboards for banquet purposes."

== Links ==
National Register of Historic Places Nomination Form
