= D'Iberville High School =

d'Iberville High School
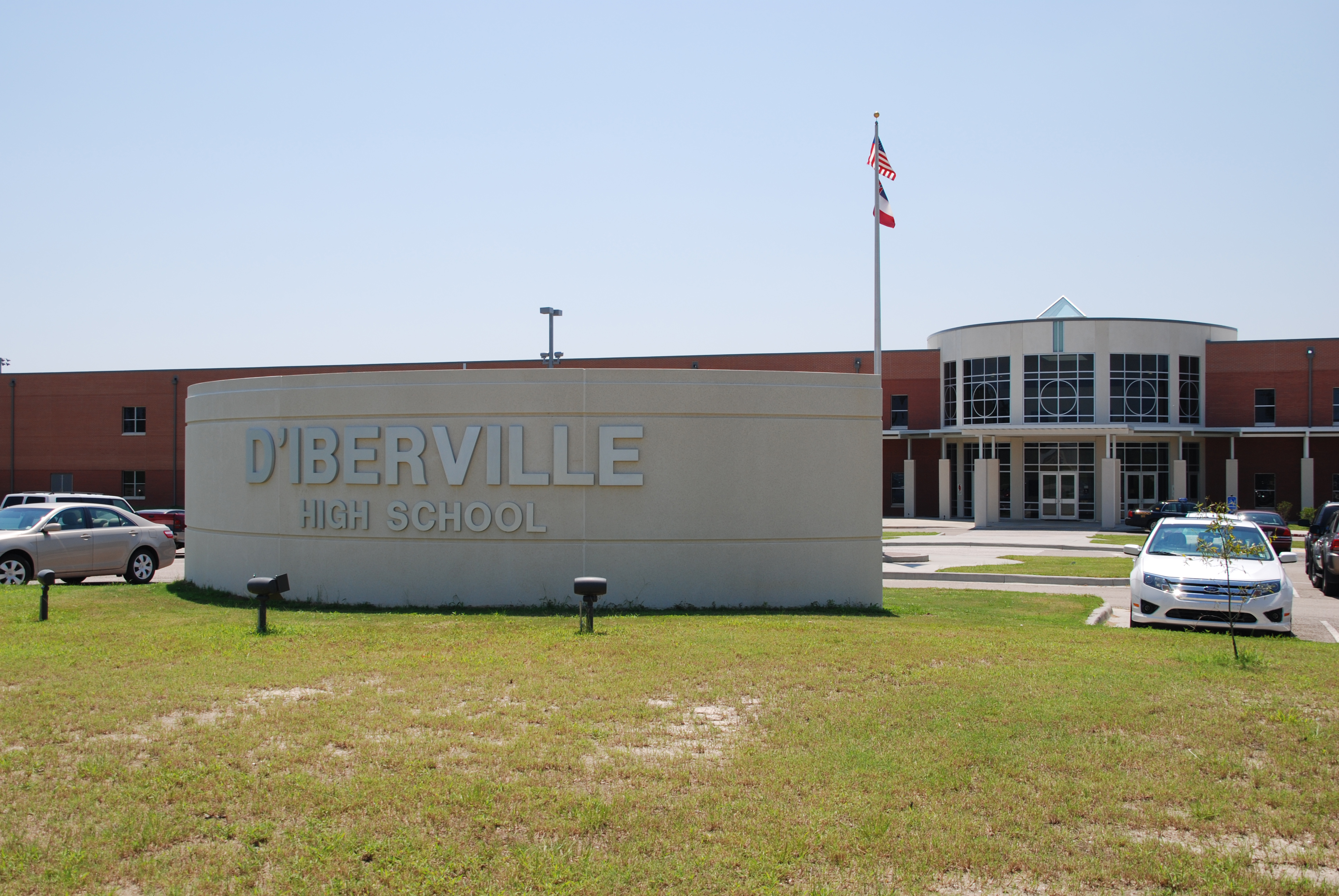

Location
- 15625 Lamey Bridge Road; Biloxi, MS 39532; United States; 30°30′42″N 88°55′58″W

Information
- Type: Public high school
- School district: Harrison County School District
- Principal: Cheryle Broadus
- Teaching staff: 77.52 (on an FTE basis)
- Enrollment: 1,474 (2023–2024)
- Student to teacher ratio: 19.01
- Colors: Black; Gold
- Mascot: The Warriors
- Feeder schools: D’Iberville Middle School (4-8), North Woolmarket Elementary and Middle School (K-8), and Creekbend Elementary and Middle School (K-8)
- Website: harrisondibervillehigh.ss11.sharpschool.com
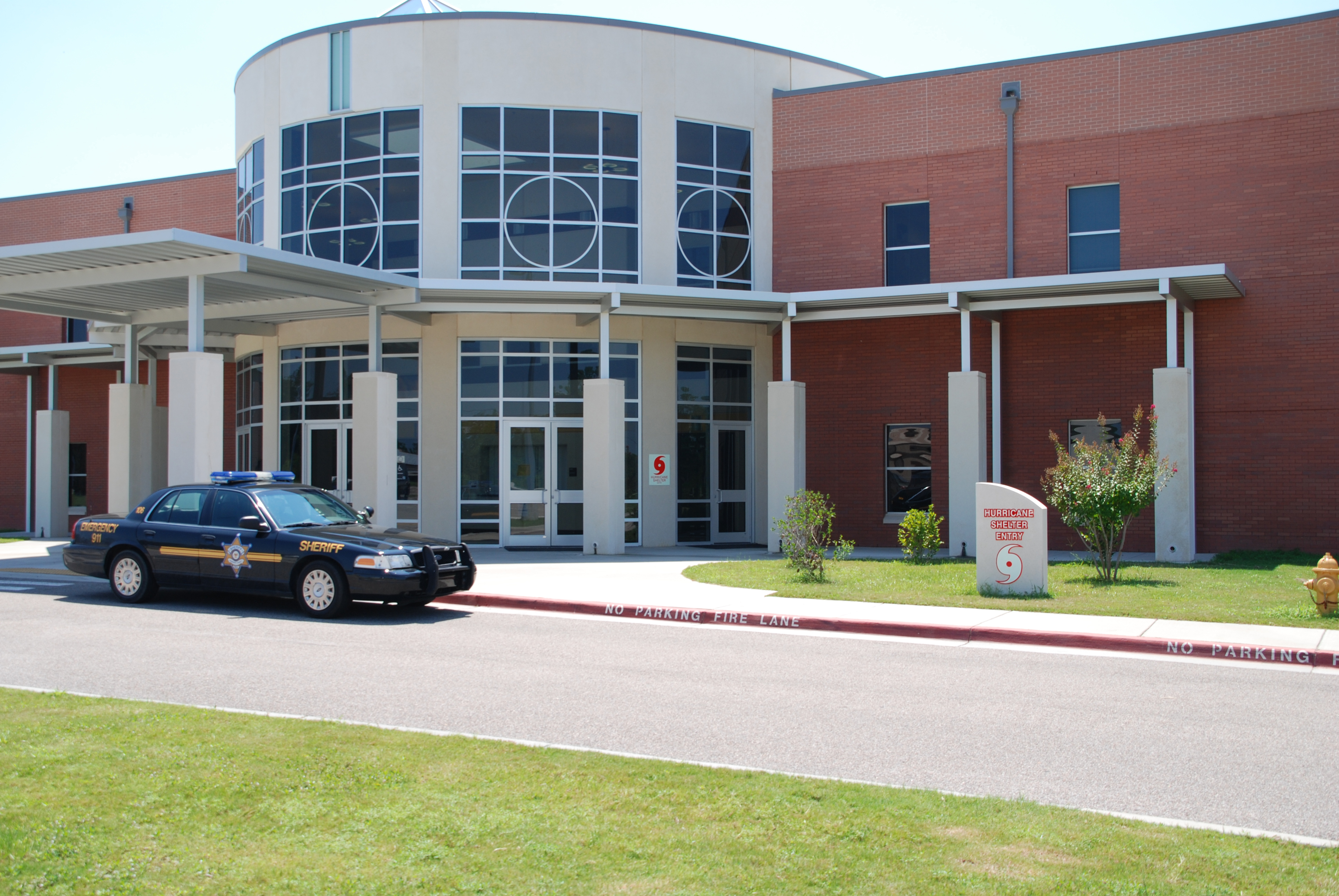

d'Iberville High School is a suburban public high school located in D'Iberville, Mississippi, United States, with a Biloxi postal address. A new high school building was dedicated on March 15, 2009 at 15625 Lamey Bridge Road. The former high school building, located at 3320 Warrior Drive, is now D'Iberville Middle School. The high school is part of the Harrison County School District, serves 1,290 students as of the 2019–2020 school year, and consists of students from North Woolmarket Elementary/Middle, Creekbend Elementary/Middle, and D'Iberville Middle School.

== Athletics ==
The school's football team won the Mississippi 4A state championship in 2002.

== Notable alumni ==
- Reggie Collier, former NFL quarterback
- Christine Kozlowski, crowned Miss Mississippi in 2008
- Kevin Norwood, former NFL wide receiver
- Chase Sherman, UFC fighter
- Jaden Walley, college football wide receiver for the Mississippi State Bulldogs
- Justin Walley, college football cornerback for the Minnesota Golden Gophers
