= Convicts' Bread Oven =

Historic oven in Colorado, United States

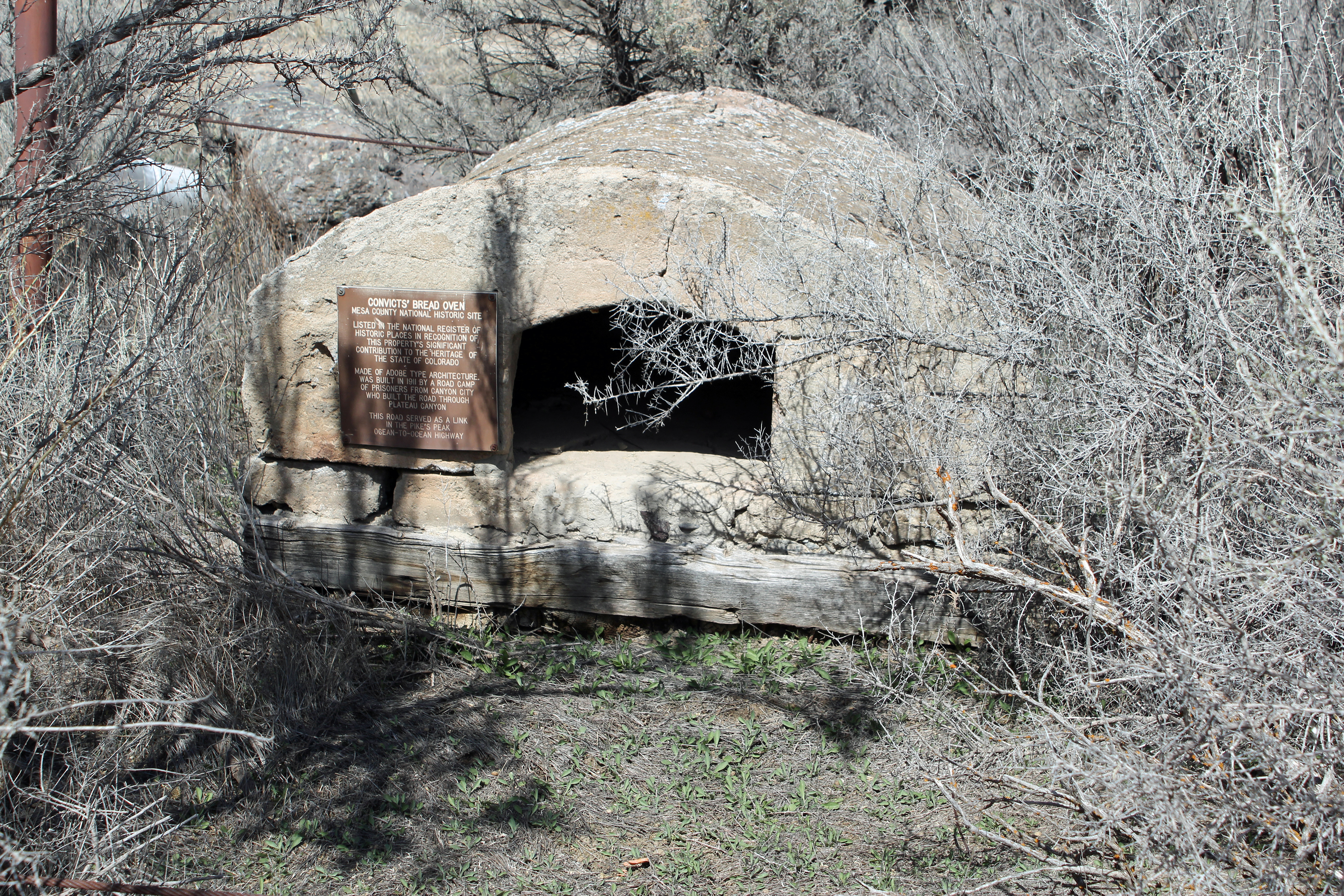
The Convicts' Bread Oven

The Convicts' Bread Oven is a concrete oven built in 1911 in the style of Mexican adobe ovens. It was used to bake bread daily from April 1911 through July 1912 to feed 30 state prison inmates and their guards as they worked on a stretch of road in Plateau Canyon.

The oven was listed on the National Register of Historic Places on December 31, 1974.

The oven is 7 feet long, nearly 5 feet wide, 4 feet tall and sits halfway between Plateau Creek and Colorado State Highway 65 about 7 miles east of Interstate 70. The convicts' camp was two miles north where a dry gulch empties into Plateau Creek.
