= IOOF Hall (De Beque, Colorado) =

- U.S. National Register of Historic Places
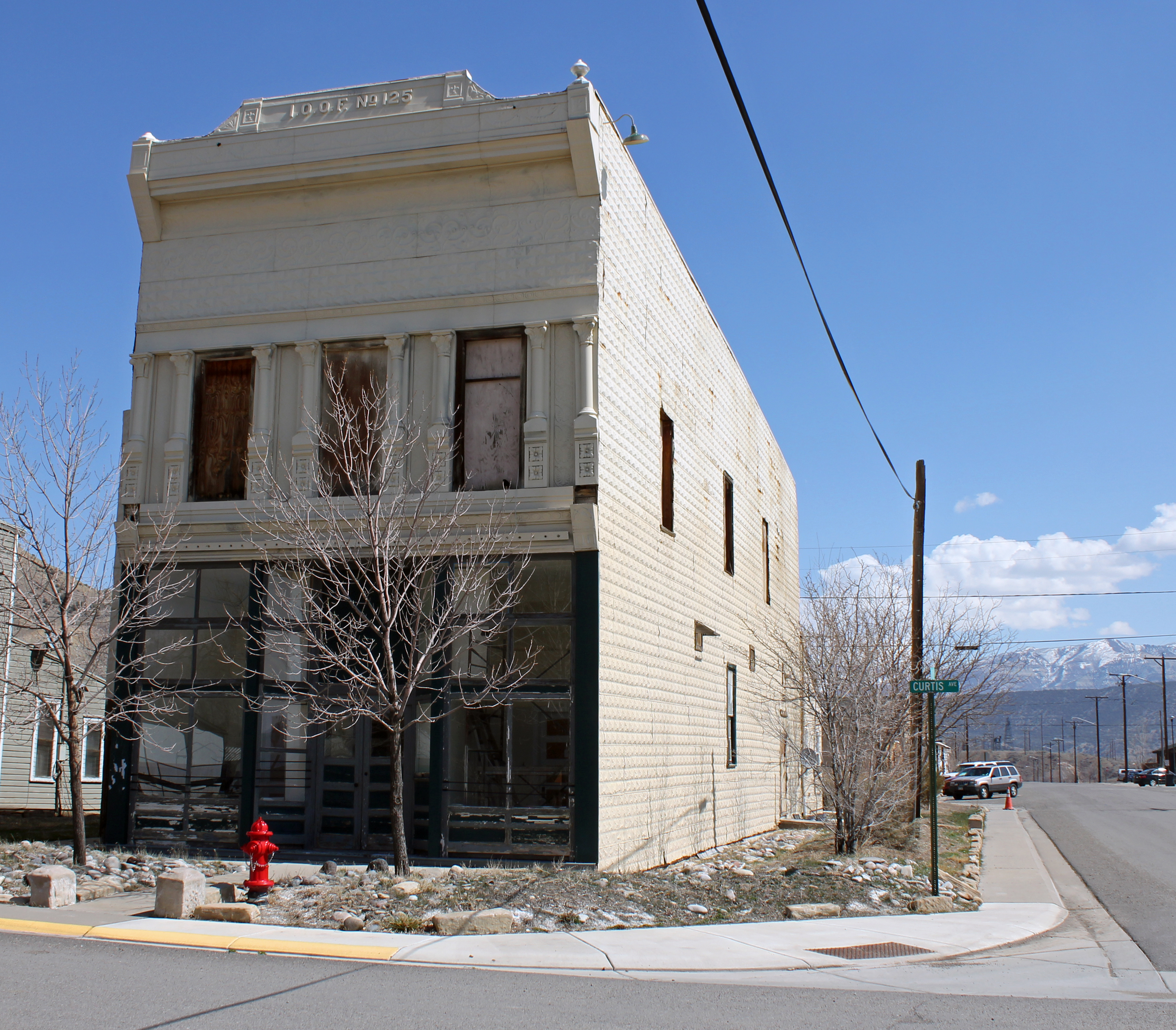
- The Hall in 2013

- Location within Colorado Location within the United States
- Location: Jct. of 4th St. and Curtis Ave., De Beque, Colorado
- Coordinates: 39°20′0″N 108°12′51″W
- Area: less than one acre
- Built: 1900
- Architectural style: Late 19th and Early 20th Century American Movements
- NRHP reference No.: 93000200
- Added to NRHP: March 25, 1993

The IOOF Hall, which has also been known as Crest Theatre, is a two-story building in De Beque, Colorado that was built in 1900. Its second floor's large lodge room served historically as a meeting hall for the Odd Fellows and corresponding Rebekahs groups. First floor rooms of the building served variously as a theater with stage and orchestra pit for local and travelling shows, a community center, and a dance hall. A small projection booth above the lobby, accessed by a steep stairway, was added for the Crest Theatre to begin operating in 1917. Both floors have 15 feet (4.6 m) ceilings and there is a stamped tin lining high on the second floor wall.

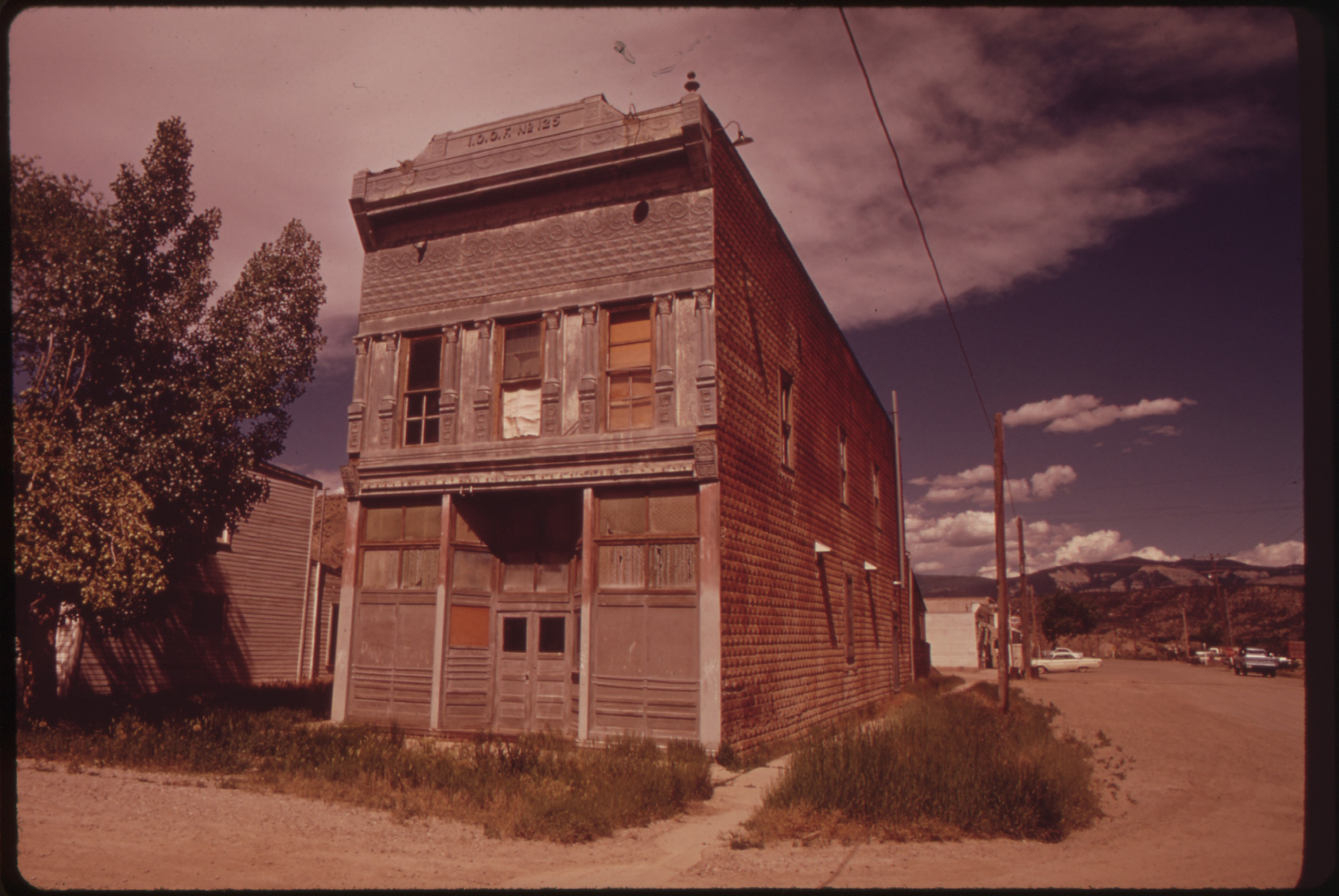
Hall in 1973

In 1982, when it was nominated for listing on the National Register of Historic Places, the 25 feet (7.6 m) by 93 feet (28 m) building was clad with original, unusual metal siding stamped to resemble stone blocks, which had rusted and had long been unpainted. A 2013 photo (above) shows the stamped siding along the long South side of the building, painted but with rust streaks running down in a few spots. Its front facade includes stamped tin engaged columns and stamped tin panels featuring flowery patterns. At the top is "IOOF No 125" in raised letters.

The building was deemed significant for its association with social and entertainment history of De Beque, and also for its unique architecture including the stamped metal siding.

It was listed on the National Register of Historic Places in 1993.
