= C. Lewis Harrison House =

Historic house in Massachusetts, United States

- U.S. National Register of Historic Places
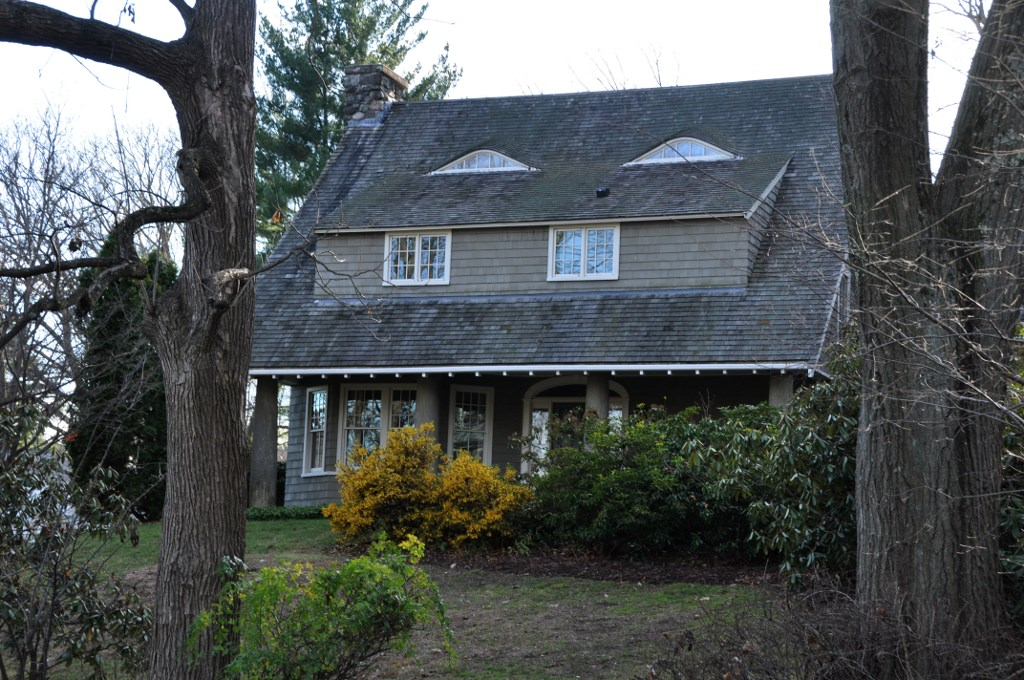

- Location within Massachusetts Location within the United States
- Location: 14 Eliot Memorial Rd., Newton, Massachusetts
- Coordinates: 42°20′39″N 71°10′46″W
- Built: 1915
- Architect: Brainerd & Leeds
- Architectural style: Bungalow/Craftsman
- MPS: Newton MRA
- NRHP reference No.: 90000045
- Added to NRHP: February 16, 1990

The C. Lewis Harrison House is a historic house at 14 Eliot Memorial Road in Newton, Massachusetts. The 1 3/4 story wood-frame house was built c. 1915 for Charles Lewis Harrison, a Boston lawyer. It is an excellent example of a Craftsman cottage, attractively set on a wooded lot overlooking the Commonwealth Country Club. Its roof has a large shed-roof dormer, above which there are two eyebrow windows. The roof slopes down over a porch, and is supported by large rustic concrete columns. The main entrance is traditional in appearance, with flanking sidelight windows and a fanlight above. Twin rubblestone chimneys rise from the sides of the house.

The house was listed on the National Register of Historic Places in 1990.

== See also ==
- National Register of Historic Places listings in Newton, Massachusetts
