= Wood–Harrison House =

Historic house in Utah, United States

- U.S. National Register of Historic Places
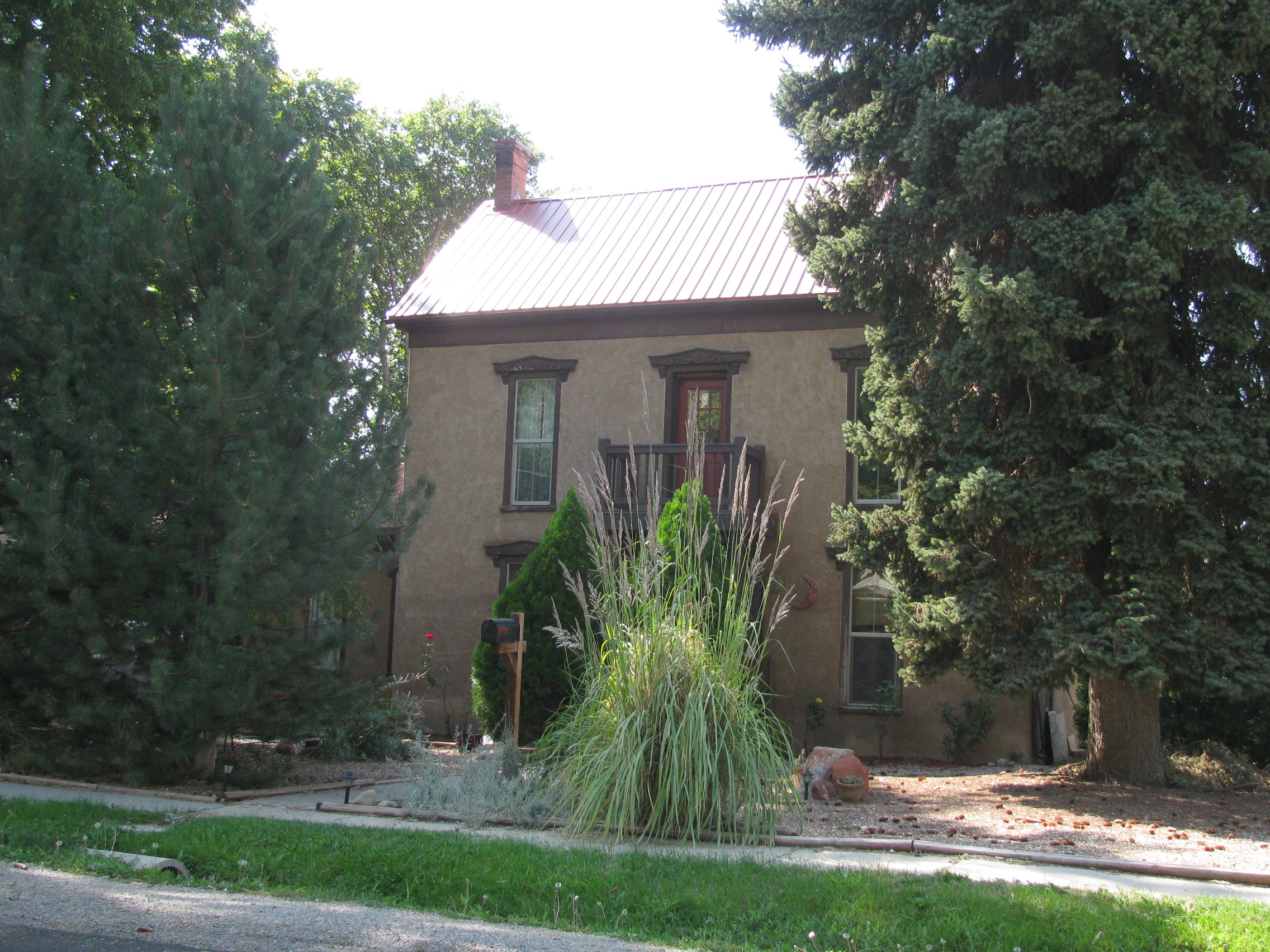

- Location within Utah Location within the United States
- Location: 310 S. 300 West, Springville, Utah
- Coordinates: 40°9′44″N 111°36′56″W
- Area: less than one acre
- Built: 1853, 1877
- NRHP reference No.: 83003198
- Added to NRHP: January 19, 1983

The Wood–Harrison House at 310 S. 300 West in Springville, Utah was built in 1853 and expanded in 1877. It was listed on the National Register of Historic Places in 1983.

The original 1853 home was adobe, a one-story rectangular cabin-type house. By 1877 it had been sold and two-story house was added to the end of the original building, making it a hall-and-parlor I-house. This reflects general economic prosperity of the times. The house was identified in a 1981 architectural survey of Springville as being "the best known and more carefully documented residence reflecting this historical transition."
