= E. H. Harrison House =

Historic house in Iowa, United States

- U.S. National Register of Historic Places
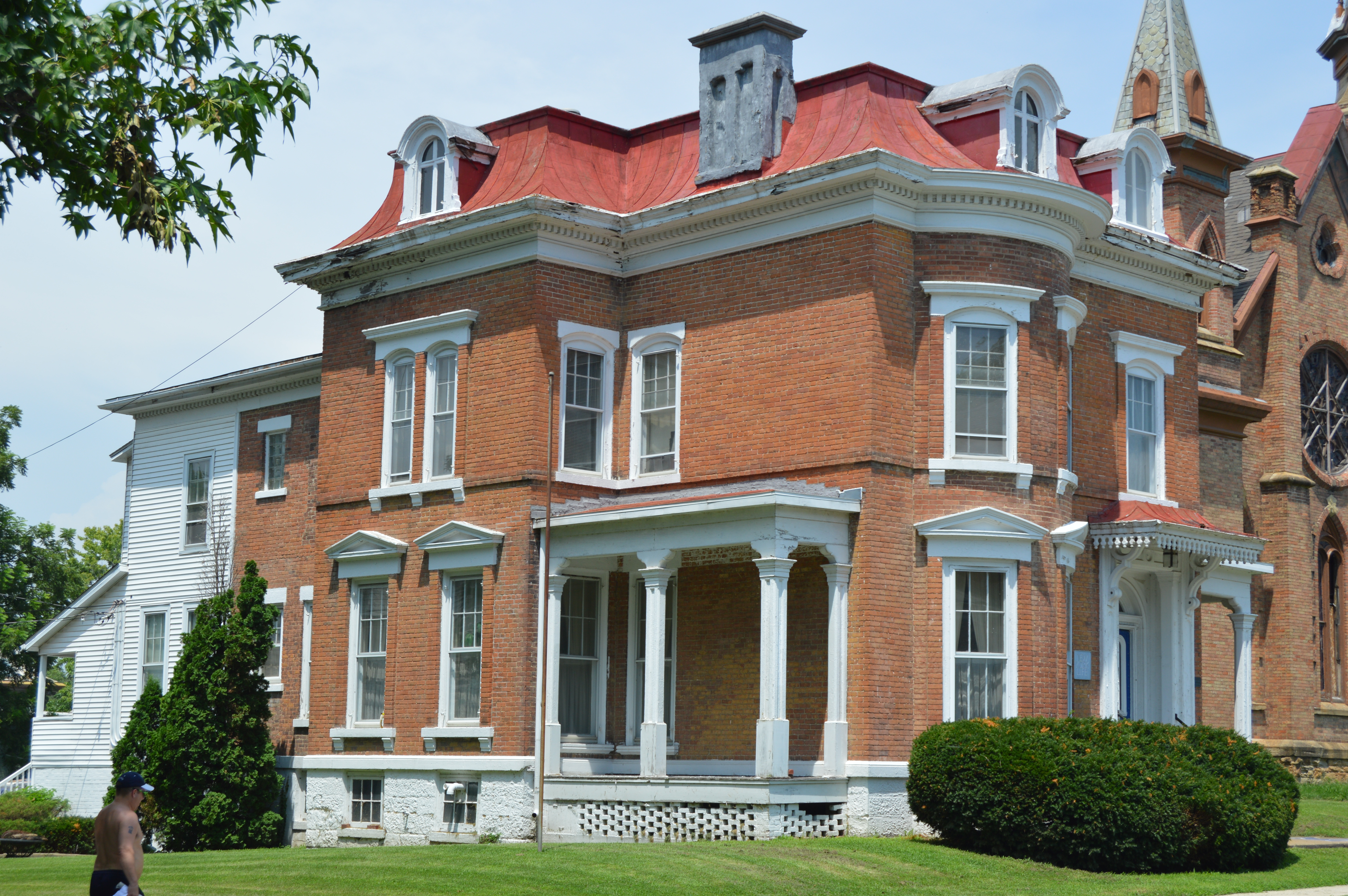
- Front and southwestern side

- Location within Iowa Location within the United States
- Location: 220 N. 4th St. Keokuk, Iowa
- Coordinates: 40°23′48″N 91°22′52″W
- Area: less than one acre
- Built: 1857
- Built by: R.P. Gray
- Architect: Frederick H. Moore
- Architectural style: Federal; Second Empire
- NRHP reference No.: 84001270
- Added to NRHP: January 12, 1984

The E. H. Harrison House is a historic building located in Keokuk, Iowa, United States. It was designed in a combination of Federal, Greek Revival, and Second Empire styles by local architect Frederick H. Moore and built in 1857 by local builder R.P. Gray. It is believed that this is the first house in Iowa to have a Mansard roof, which is its Second Empire influence. The Federal style is found in the building's large windows, the elliptical doorway arch, the bowed two-story front bay, and the brickwork. The Greek Revival style is found in the offset doorway. Its interior features a unique open, two-story, self-supporting staircase that is said to be one of seven in existence in the United States. Additions have been built onto the back of the house, but their dates are unknown.

The man who had the house built was Enos H. Harrison, who was a successful businessman originally from Elizabeth, New Jersey. He and his family settled in Keokuk in 1849. In Iowa, he helped establish the Keokuk Branch of the Iowa State Bank where he served as its first president. He also helped to establish the waterworks in Keokuk and the Iowa State Insurance Company. Harrison was involved with other business interests and the local Unitarian Church, which was located next door. He also served four terms as First Ward Alderman in Keokuk. Harrison died here in 1877, and the family sold the house. It was converted into offices around 1967. The building is said to be haunted by a friendly ghost, although it reportedly chased out one of the building's tenants. It was listed on the National Register of Historic Places in 1984.
