= Harrison County Courthouse =

Harrison County Courthouse may refer to:

- Harrison County Courthouse (Indiana), Corydon, Indiana
- Harrison County Courthouse (Iowa), Logan, Iowa
- Old Harrison County Courthouse (Iowa), Magnolia, Iowa
- Harrison County Courthouse (Kentucky), Cynthiana, Kentucky
- Harrison County Courthouse (Ohio), Cadiz, Ohio
- Old Harrison County Courthouse (Texas), Marshall, Texas
- Harrison County Courthouse (West Virginia), Clarksburg, West Virginia
