= Kevin Norwood =

American football player (born 1989)

No. 81, 83
- Position: Wide receiver

Personal information
- Born: September 23, 1989 (age 37); Biloxi, Mississippi, U.S.
- Listed height: 6 ft 2 in (1.88 m)
- Listed weight: 212 lb (96 kg)

Career information
- High school: D'Iberville (MS)
- College: Alabama (2009–2013)
- NFL draft: 2014: 4th round, 123rd overall pick

Career history
- Seattle Seahawks (2014); Carolina Panthers (2015–2016); San Diego Chargers (2016)*; New York Giants (2016–2017)
- * Offseason or practice squad member only

Awards and highlights
- 3× BCS national champion (2009, 2011, 2012)

Career NFL statistics
- Games played: 10
- Receptions: 9
- Receiving yards: 102
- Stats at Pro Football Reference

Kevin Norwood (born September 23, 1989) is an American former professional football player who was a wide receiver in the National Football League (NFL). He was selected by the Seattle Seahawks in the fourth round of the 2014 NFL draft. He played college football for the Alabama Crimson Tide.

== Early life ==
Norwood was born and raised in Biloxi, Mississippi and has three brothers and one sister. He was ranked as the 69th overall prospect by the Mobile Press-Register's Super Southeast 120. He was member of the Orlando Sentinel All-Southern team in high school. He was named as the Sun Herald's South Mississippi Defensive Player of the Year. He was selected as Mr. South Mississippi Football. He was ranked as the 44th wide receiver prospect by Scout.com. He was selected to the first-team All-State by the Jackson Clarion-Ledger.

College recruiting
Name	Hometown	School	Height	Weight	40^{‡}	Commit date
Kevin Norwood; Wide receiver	D'Iberville, Mississippi	D'Iberville High School	6 ft 3 in (1.91 m)	180 lb (82 kg)	4.55	Dec 16, 2008
Kevin Norwood; Wide receiver	Recruit ratings: Scout: Rivals:					
Overall recruit ranking: Scout: 44 (WR) Rivals: 147 National, 22 (WR), 5 (MS)
‡ Refers to 40-yard dash; Note: In many cases, Scout, Rivals, 247Sports, On3, and ESPN may conflict in their listings of height, weight and 40 time.; In these cases, the average was taken. ESPN grades are on a 100-point scale.; Sources: "Alabama Football Commitments". Rivals.; "2009 Alabama Football Recruiting Commits". Scout.; "Scout.com Team Recruiting Rankings". Scout.; "2009 Team Ranking". Rivals.com.

== College career ==
Norwood attended the University of Alabama from 2009 to 2013. He finished his career with a total of 81 receptions for 1,275 yards and 12 touchdowns. He won three BCS National Championships with the Crimson Tide.

=== Statistics ===
	Receiving				
Year	G	Rec	Yds	Avg	TD
2010	13	3	56	18.7	1
2011	11	11	190	17.3	0
2012	13	29	461	15.9	4
2013	12	38	568	14.9	7
Career	49	81	1,275	15.7	12

== Professional career ==
Pre-draft measurables
Height	Weight	Arm length	Hand span	Wingspan	40-yard dash	10-yard split	20-yard split	20-yard shuttle	Three-cone drill	Vertical jump	Broad jump	Bench press
6 ft 2 in (1.88 m)	198 lb (90 kg)	32 1/8 in (0.82 m)	10 in (0.25 m)	6 ft 3 3/4 in (1.92 m)	4.48 s	1.60 s	2.65 s	4.32 s	6.68 s	33.0 in (0.84 m)	10 ft 1 in (3.07 m)	8 reps
All values from NFL Combine

=== Seattle Seahawks ===
Norwood was selected by the Seattle Seahawks with the 123rd pick in the fourth round of the 2014 NFL draft. As a rookie, he had nine receptions for 102 yards in nine games and two starts in the 2014 season.

=== Carolina Panthers ===
Norwood was traded to the Carolina Panthers on August 30, 2015. On February 7, 2016, Norwood's Panthers played in Super Bowl 50. He was inactive for the game, which saw the Panthers fall to the Denver Broncos by a score of 24–10.

On September 3, 2016, Norwood was placed on injured reserve. Norwood was released on September 30, 2016.

=== San Diego Chargers ===
On October 4, 2016, Norwood was signed to the practice squad of the San Diego Chargers. He was released on November 1, 2016.

=== New York Giants ===
On November 9, 2016, Norwood was signed to the New York Giants' practice squad. He signed a reserve/future contract with the Giants on January 9, 2017.

On August 14, 2017, Norwood was waived/injured by the Giants with a hip injury and placed on injured reserve. He was released with an injury settlement on November 22, 2017.
