= Harrison School (St. Louis, Missouri) =

- U.S. National Register of Historic Places
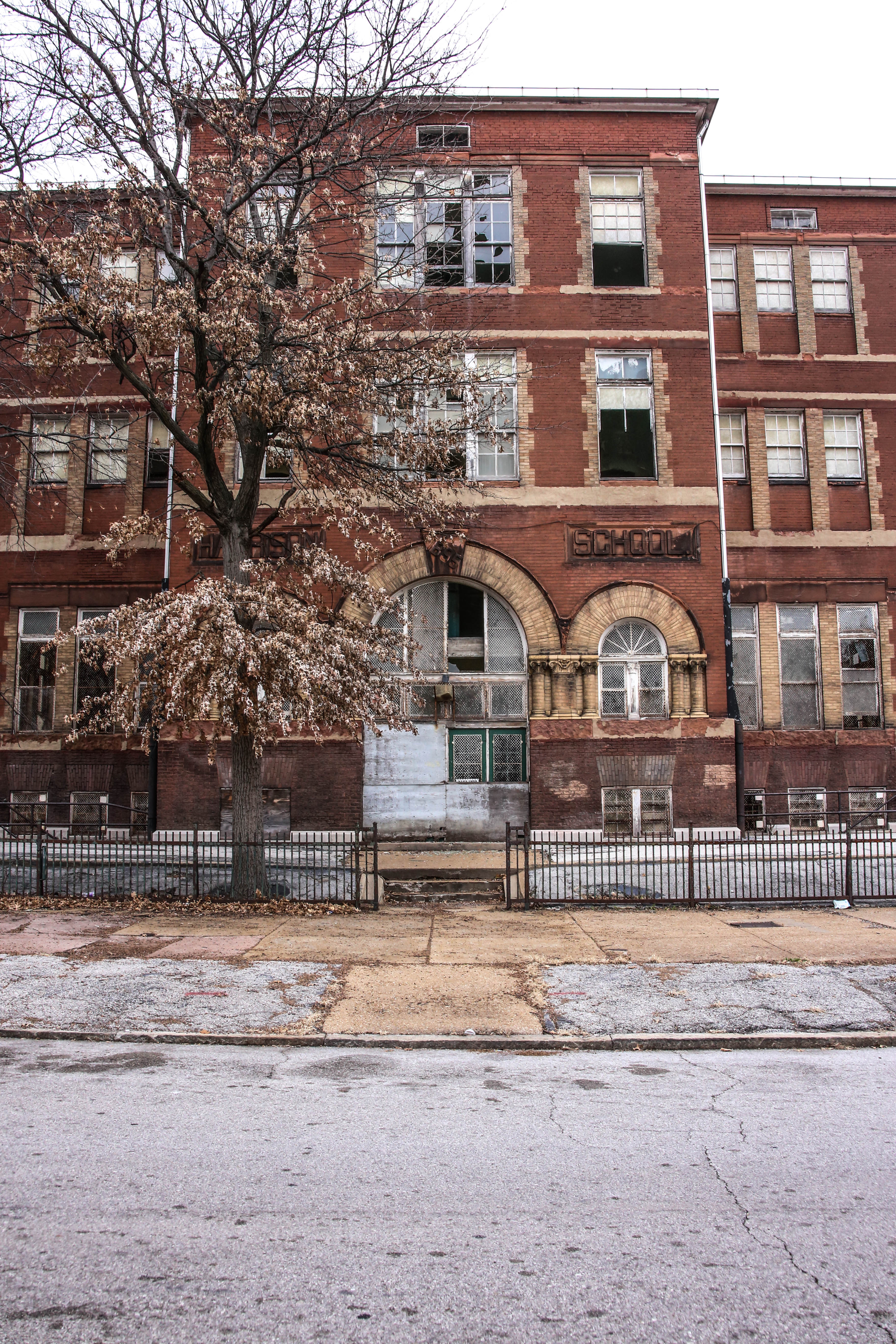
- Harrison School in 2014

- Location within St. Louis Location within Missouri Location within the United States
- Location: 4224 Fair Av., St. Louis, Missouri
- Coordinates: 38°40′28″N 90°13′26″W
- Built: 1899
- Architect: Kirchner, August H.
- Architectural style: Romanesque
- NRHP reference No.: 07000703
- Added to NRHP: July 18, 2007

Harrison School in St. Louis, Missouri was built in a Romanesque style in 1895. It was listed on the National Register of Historic Places in 2007.

It was closed as a school in 1996(IN-DISPUTE). It was put up for sale by the school district in 2003 and sold in 2007. In 2008 the project was awarded four percent tax credits for its rehabilitation.
