= D'Iberville, Mississippi =

City in Mississippi, US

D'Iberville
- City
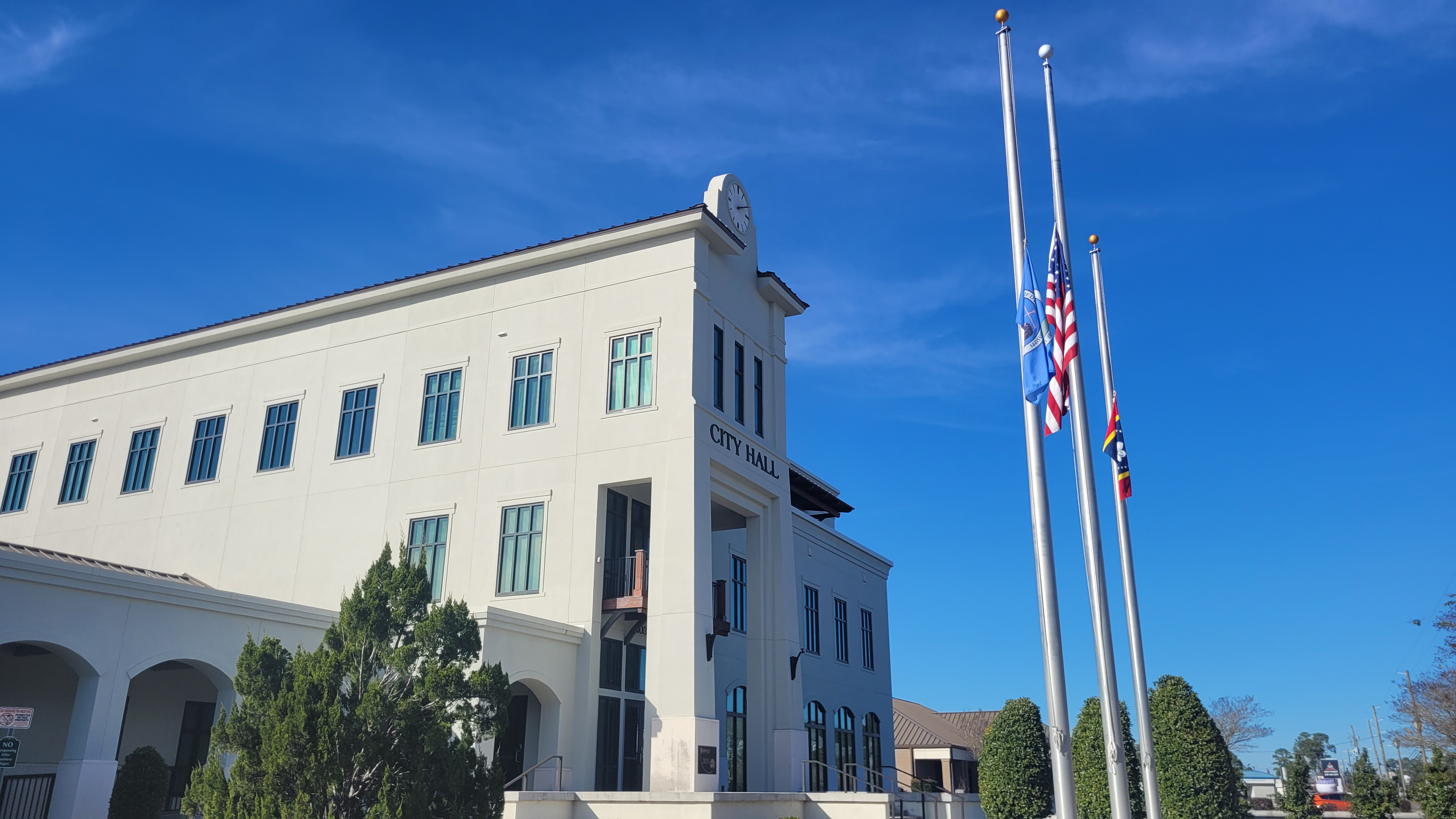
- D'Iberville City Hall

- Flag Seal

- Location of D'Iberville, Mississippi
- Coordinates: 30°26′13″N 88°53′51″W
- Country: United States
- State: Mississippi
- County: Harrison
- Born: July 9, 1661
- Incorporated: February 23, 1988
- Named for: Pierre Le Moyne d'Iberville

Government
  - Mayor: Rusty Quave (R)

Area
  - City: 10.86 sq mi (28.12 km^{2})
  - Land: 10.56 sq mi (27.36 km^{2})
  - Water: 0.30 sq mi (0.77 km^{2})
- Elevation: 13 ft (4 m)

Population (2020)
  - City: 12,721
  - Estimate (2022): 13,309
  - Density: 1,200/sq mi (465/km^{2})
  - Urban: 236,344 (US: 167th)
  - Metro: 420,782 (US: 129th)
- Time zone: UTC-6 (Central (CST))
  - Summer (DST): UTC-5 (CDT)
- ZIP code: 39540
- Area code: 228
- FIPS code: 28-19180
- GNIS feature ID: 0669069
- Website: diberville.ms.us

D'Iberville (/diˈaɪbərvɪl/ dee-EYE-bər-vil) is a city in Harrison County, Mississippi, United States, immediately north of Biloxi, across the Back Bay. The population was 12,721 at the 2020 census. It is part of the Gulfport–Biloxi metropolitan area.

== Etymology ==
It is named after Canadian explorer Pierre Le Moyne d'Iberville, who arrived at the area in 1699. Almost 300 years later, D'Iberville officially became a city in 1988.

== History ==
D'Iberville was one of the Gulf Coast cities hit and extensively damaged by Hurricane Katrina on August 29, 2005. The following month, Mexican marines, the U.S. Navy, and Dutch navy sailors were sent to the city to clean up hurricane debris and distribute aid supplies.

As a result of an initiative by the Congress for the New Urbanism under the sponsorship of Governor Haley Barbour and the State of Mississippi, the City of D'Iberville received town design consulting services from some of the most prestigious urban designers in the country. Since then, the City of D'Iberville has been working with Jaime Correa and Associates on the implementation of its master plan, on a full-fledged New Urbanism SmartCode for its downtown area, and on the implementation of mixed-use neighborhoods and main street.

== Geography ==
D'Iberville is located at 30°26′13″N 88°53′51″W.

According to the United States Census Bureau, the city has a total area of 7.3 square miles (19.0 km^{2}), of which 7.1 square miles (18.3 km^{2}) is land and 0.27 square miles (0.7 km^{2}), or 3.84%, is water.

== Demographics ==
Historical population
Census	Pop.	Note	%±
1990	6,566		—
2000	7,608		15.9%
2010	9,486		24.7%
2020	12,721		34.1%
2022 (est.)	13,309		4.6%
U.S. Decennial Census; 2020 Census

=== 2020 census ===
As of the 2020 census, D'Iberville had a population of 12,721. The median age was 35.4 years. 24.2% of residents were under the age of 18 and 13.7% of residents were 65 years of age or older. For every 100 females there were 93.6 males, and for every 100 females age 18 and over there were 90.2 males age 18 and over.

95.0% of residents lived in urban areas, while 5.0% lived in rural areas.

There were 5,046 households in D'Iberville, of which 34.3% had children under the age of 18 living in them. Of all households, 38.9% were married-couple households, 20.1% were households with a male householder and no spouse or partner present, and 32.6% were households with a female householder and no spouse or partner present. About 29.7% of all households were made up of individuals and 9.6% had someone living alone who was 65 years of age or older.

There were 5,371 housing units, of which 6.1% were vacant. The homeowner vacancy rate was 1.2% and the rental vacancy rate was 7.2%. There were 3,137 families residing in the city.

D'Iberville racial composition as of 2020
Race	Number	Percent
White (non-Hispanic)	6,943	54.6%
Black or African American (non-Hispanic)	2,620	20.6%
Native American	34	0.27%
Asian	1,327	10.43%
Pacific Islander	17	0.13%
Other/Mixed	787	6.19%
Hispanic or Latino	993	7.81%

== Arts and culture ==
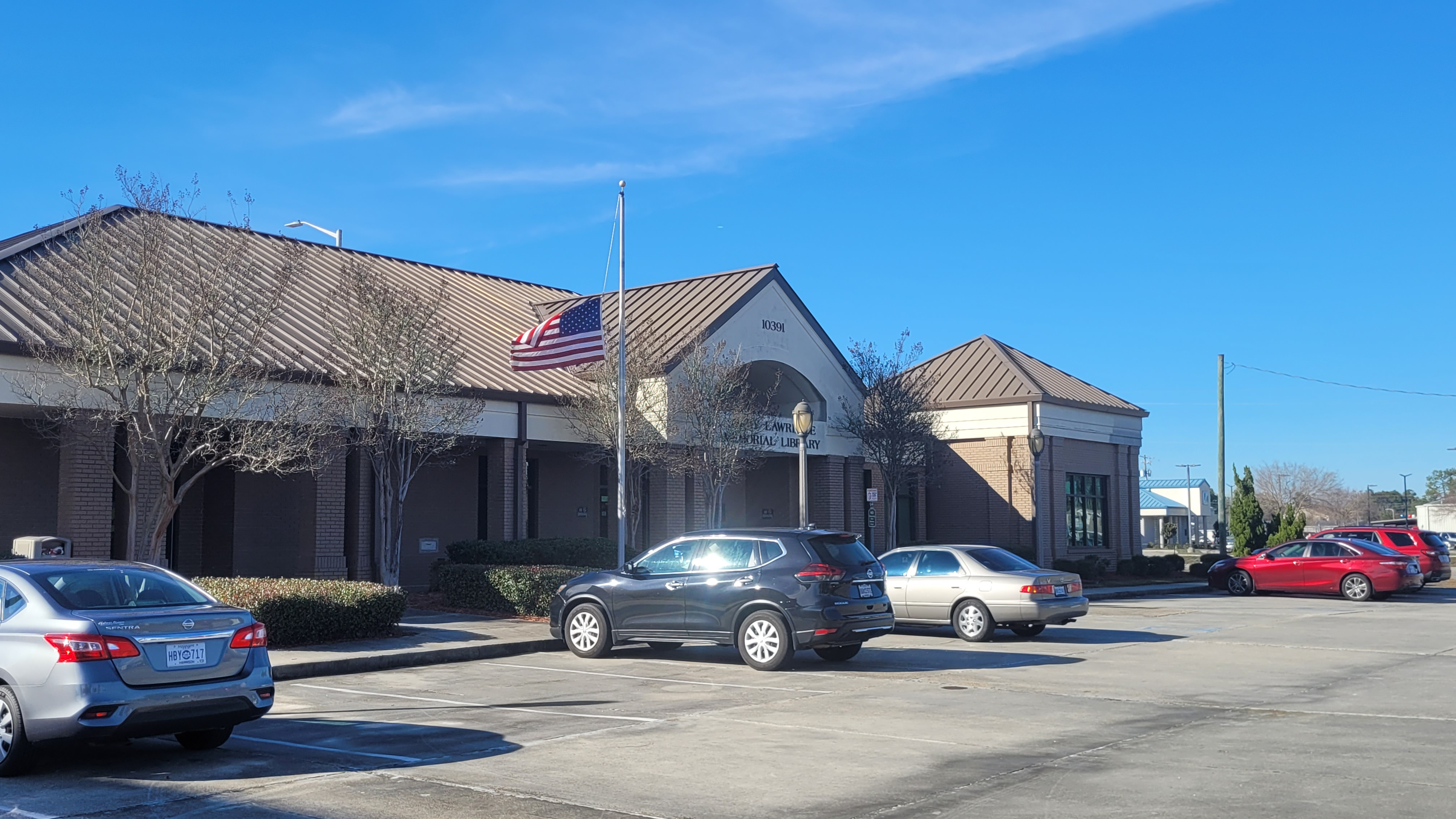
Jerry Lawrence Memorial Library in D'Iberville

The Harrison County Library System serves D'Iberville through the Jerry Lawrence Memorial Library.

== Education ==
The city of D'Iberville is served by the Harrison County School District.

- D'Iberville High School
- D'Iberville Middle School
- D'Iberville Elementary School

== Notable people ==
- Brandon Davis, mixed martial arts fighter
- Jason Knight, mixed martial arts fighter
- Christine Kozlowski, actress and Miss Mississippi 2008
- Kevin Norwood, former NFL wide receiver
- Chase Sherman, mixed martial arts fighter
