= Sen. James A. Harrison House =

United States historic place in Nogales, Arizona

- U.S. National Register of Historic Places
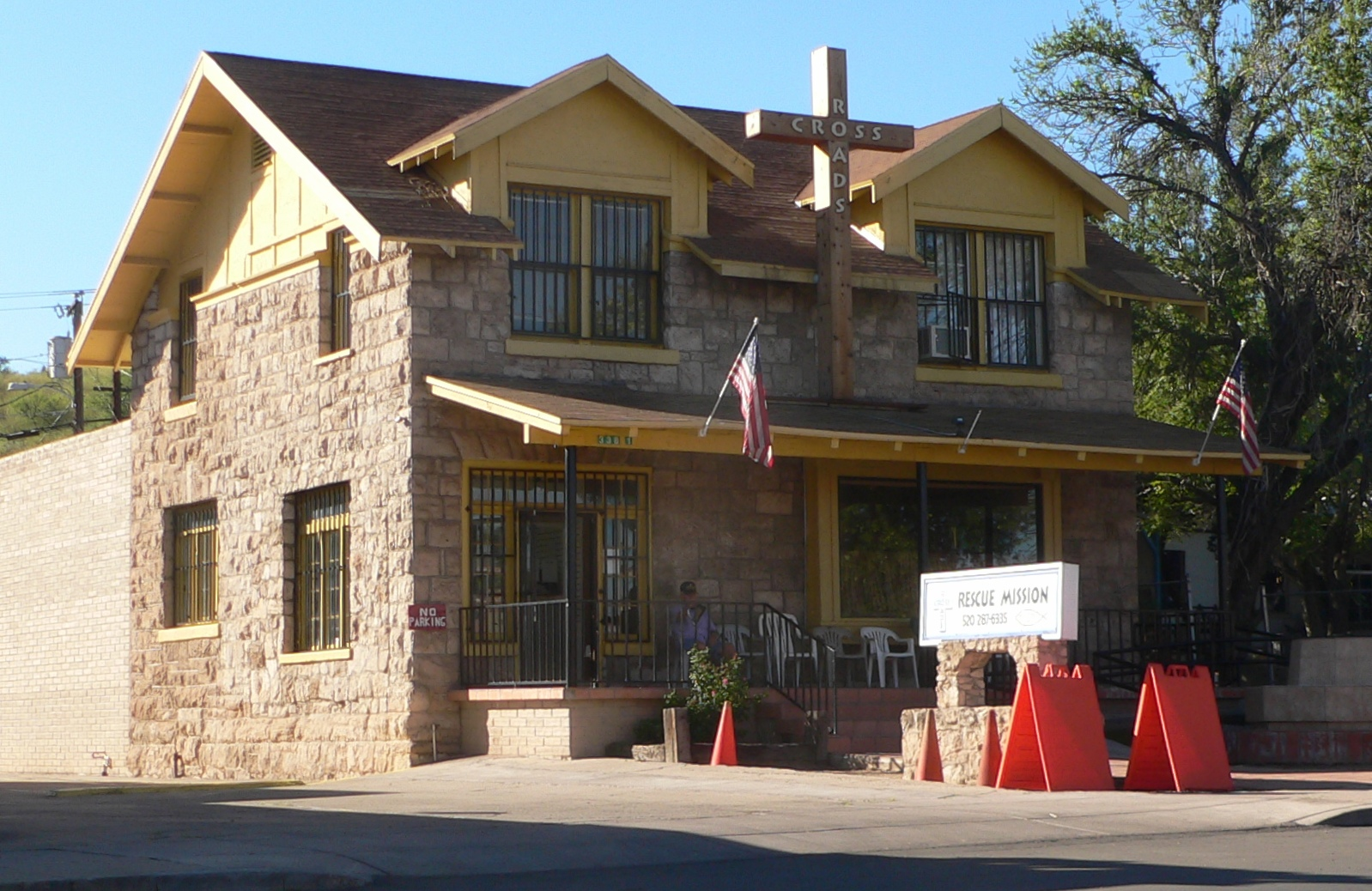
- The house in 2013

- Location within Arizona
- Location: 449 Morley, Nogales, Arizona
- Coordinates: 31°20′17″N 110°56′10″W
- Area: 0 acres (0 ha)
- Built: 1915
- Architectural style: American Craftsman
- MPS: Nogales MRA
- NRHP reference No.: 85001854
- Added to NRHP: August 29, 1985

The Sen. James A. Harrison House is a historic house in Nogales, Arizona. It was built in 1915 for Senator James A. Harrison, and designed in the American Craftsman architectural style. It has been listed on the National Register of Historic Places since August 29, 1985.

Its Arizona State Historic Property Inventory report asserted it is the "Best preserved two-story Bungalow in Nogales."
