= Harrison House (Fredericton) =

Residence at the University of New Brunswick

Coordinates: 45°56′45.55″N 66°38′26.83″W

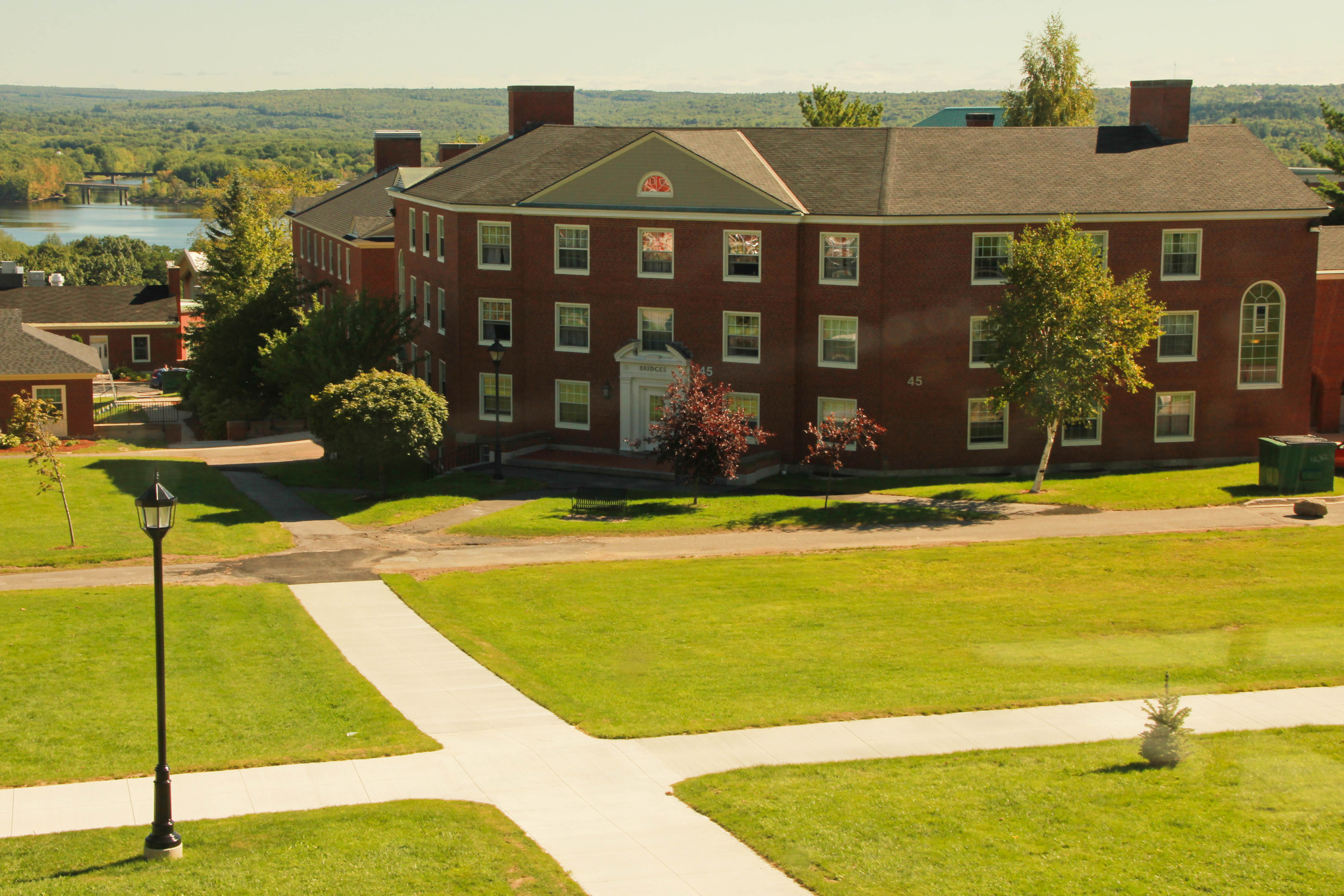
Bridges House at the University of New Brunswick.

Harrison House is a university residence at the University of New Brunswick, Fredericton, New Brunswick, Canada. It was built in 1962 as part of the largest building program at UNB which included several other residences and faculty buildings. When it was built, it was operated as an all-male residence, but from September 1991 to present, it has been a co-ed residence on the UNB Fredericton campus. The mascot for Harrison is the Husky and the house colours consist of red, and black.

== UNB residences ==
At UNB in 2011, there are fourteen different residence houses, each with its own character, culture, and traditions. There are one men's, two women's, nine co-ed, one apartment style, and one suite style residence. Most of the early residences have changed in format from single-gender houses to co-educational style configurations since their original construction from the late 1950s and early 1960s. Harrison changed from male residence to co-ed residence for autumn 1991.

=== Community organization ===
The UNB residence community is loosely based upon the Oxbridge system of separate colleges within a federalised university system. As such, Harrison is part of a larger community of residences at UNB. It is located as part of campus' central 'quad' zone. The residence community has various staff and leadership, and at the house-level, a Don (faculty/staff or senior grad student) who lives in the residence. The Don is assisted by floor Proctors and educational Proctors (senior undergraduates who help the students adjust to residence and university life).

=== UNB social life ===
The social aspect of life in residence, and particularly in Harrison has changed substantially over the years with each subsequent time period referring to a past period as a utopia. Accurately, each change has imposed a different degree of controls on social activity.

At one time, many residences operated in-house bars wherein they hosted regular parties. In later years, the bars were abolished, and the Dean of Residence office operated Campus Bar Services, a travelling bar service. Bar Services would be hired by each residence when hosting a regulated social event, of which several were permitted per term. There is now a limit of one such party per term. These limitations have been enforced to alter the image of UNB as a party-school. Also, the Liquor store on Prospect Street was named the busiest in the province, anecdotally because it was closest to UNB.

== Governance structure ==
The residents at Harrison elect a house committee to act as peer-leaders. The committee also works with the Residence Coordinator, Don, floor proctors (RAs), and educational proctors to coordinate house social, educational, charity, athletic activities, etc.

=== Resident janitorial service ===
For many years, Harrison has had a UNB-sponsored student run co-operative house janitorial students whose employees were house residents. The idea was that if the residents were able to maintain an adequate level of cleanliness, they would benefit from the income as well as gaining responsibility. The residence is one of two UNB residences that still maintains the student run Janitorial Service, also known as J-Staff.

== Events ==
=== The Great Pumpkin Sacrifice ===
Harrison House maintains the longest running tradition at UNB, The Great Pumpkin Sacrifice, which began on October 31, 1973. Allegedly, three drunk students accidentally dropped a pumpkin from the roof of the Harrison House. In 1975, the pumpkin was set on fire before being thrown from the roof of the Harrison House.

For the event a large pumpkin is carved in the face of the Roman god Janus. One side of the face is a happy face, the other a not-so-happy one. One face represent the students who have struggled for the first portion of the academic year while the other face represents hope for the second portion of the year. House residents decorate campus and the city with pumpkins in the lead-up to the event, and mark the coming of the event by a two-minute howl at midnight on each of the seven days prior to the event. Silence marks the daylight hours of 31 October in a mark of the solemnity of the occasion and the judgement that will come in the sacrifice.

Leading up to midnight on Halloween, the Great Pumpkin is escorted by a cast of actors, wise-people, and house residents guarded by the Pumpkin's militia out of the house front doors, and across campus, blessed at the former Lady Dunn Hall courtyard (now Joy Kidd House), and returned to Harrison House where it is risen to the roof and sacrificially dropped and exploded (under the supervision of a pyro-technician). Although the event has always been prescribed to take place a midnight on Halloween, for several years in the early 2000s, the timing was adjusted to just before 10 PM, so that it would not interfere with university quiet hours.

It is estimated that the event attracts around 600 people, 100 of which are from the Harrison House.

It was named the weirdest tradition of UNB by Maclean's and made the top 9 list of great Canadian campus traditions of University Affairs.

=== Orientation week ===
For a few years, until the fall of 2006, Frosh Week in Harrison House included The Mr. and Mrs. Harrison contest. This was a voluntary cross-dressing pageant, in which new Harrisonians went before a panel of judges, composed of Orientation Committee members. Last crowned contestants were Kasey Menabney and Michael Cormier.

=== 50th anniversary ===
House leadership has begun planning for a 50th anniversary celebration to be held from 29 to 31 October 2011 to coincide with the 39th annual Great Pumpkin Sacrifice.

=== House charity fundraiser ===
Residence's plan an all day curling tournament to raise money for Right To Play.

== Notable alumni ==
- Catharine Pendrel - 2008 & 2012 Canadian Olympian
- Alexander O'Donnell - Splatalot Contestant, YTV
