= Glade Park, Colorado =

Unincorporated community in Mesa County, CO, USA

- Unincorporated community
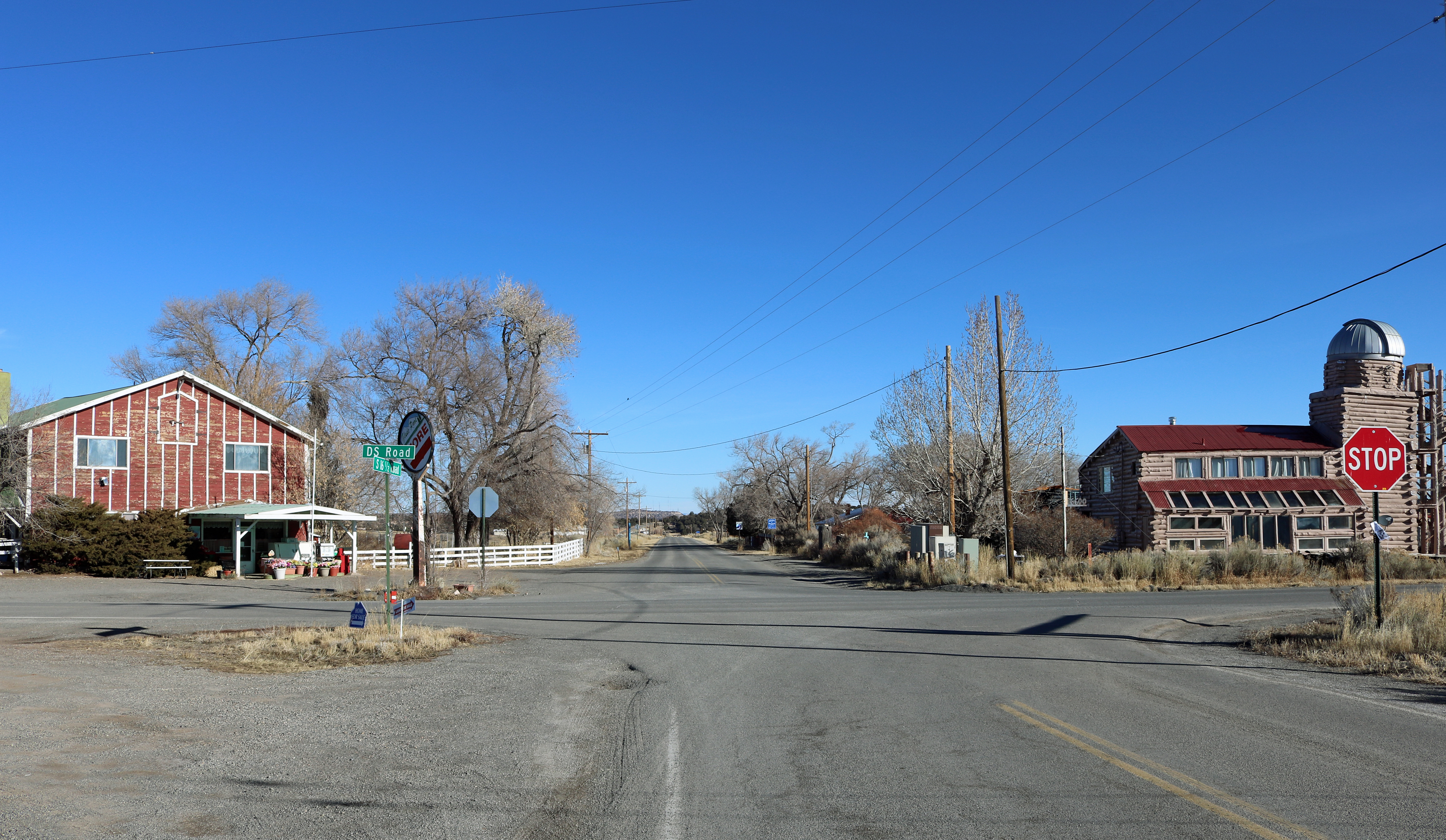
- Glade Park's main crossroads, DS and 16.5 S roads
- Interactive map of Glade Park, Colorado
- Coordinates: 38°58′50″N 108°45′30″W
- Country: United States
- State: Colorado
- Counties: Mesa
- Elevation: 6,907 ft (2,105 m)
- Time zone: UTC-7 (MST)
  - Summer (DST): UTC-6 (MDT)
- ZIP code: 81523
- Area code: 970
- GNIS feature ID: 169586

Glade Park is an unincorporated community and a U.S. Post Office located in Mesa County, Colorado, United States. The Glade Park Post Office has the ZIP Code 81523.

== Geography ==
Glade Park is 16 miles (26 km) west of downtown Grand Junction, Colorado, the largest city on Colorado's western slope. To access Glade Park, one must either drive up Little Park Road, or drive up the Rim Rock Drive in Colorado National Monument, gaining approximately 2,500 feet (760 m) elevation over 4 miles (6.4 km) of hairpin curves. The views on the drive are spectacular, encompassing red sandstone canyons and sheer rock faces. The elevation of Glade Park is approximately 7,000 feet (2,100 m). Due to the elevation, the temperature in Glade Park is typically ~10 °F cooler than in Grand Junction, though in winter temperatures can be significantly warmer than in Grand Junction if an inversion layer is present in the Grand Valley below.

== Community ==
Glade Park is a former western Colorado ranching and farming community. As precipitation has declined, much of the ranch land has been split up into 35-40 acre parcels on which homes now stand. Area zoning permits a density of one house per 35-acre (140,000 m^{2}) parcel. There is no municipal water system available in Glade Park; most houses have water wells. The water table is approximately 500 feet (150 m) below the ground surface. Some homes harvest their own water off the roof.

The remoteness of the area and the creativity of its residents, has made Glade Park home to an unusually high number of alternative and sustainably-constructed homes, including Earthships, rammed earth construction, straw bale, geodesic dome, earthen berm and log construction. The distance of many of the building lots from electrical infrastructure has stimulated construction of a number of energy self-sufficient homes.
