= National Register of Historic Places listings in Wharton County, Texas =

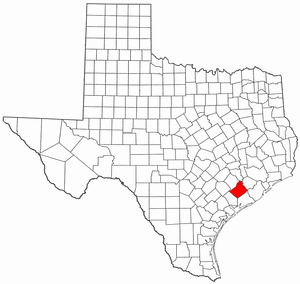
Location of Wharton County in Texas

This is a list of the National Register of Historic Places listings in Wharton County, Texas.

This is intended to be a complete list of properties and districts listed on the National Register of Historic Places in Wharton County, Texas. There are three districts and 29 individual properties listed on the National Register in the county. Two individually listed properties are Recorded Texas Historic Landmarks while one district contains several State Antiquities Landmarks including one that is also a Recorded Texas Historic Landmark.

This National Park Service list is complete through NPS recent listings posted March 21, 2025.

== Current listings ==
The locations of National Register properties and districts may be seen in a mapping service provided.

	Name on the Register	Image	Date listed	Location	City or town	Description
1	Stephen F. Austin Elementary School		February 1, 2022 (#100007404)	500 Abell St. 29°18′46″N 96°05′32″W	Wharton	
2	Willie Banker Jr. House	Willie Banker Jr. House	March 18, 1993 (#93000118)	401 N. Rusk; 29°18′49″N 96°05′52″W	Wharton	
3	Moses Bernstein House		March 18, 1993 (#93000116)	1705 N. Richmond; 29°19′35″N 96°05′51″W	Wharton	Historic and Architectural Resources of Wharton MPS
4	Bolton-Outlar House	Bolton-Outlar House	March 18, 1993 (#93000108)	517 N. Richmond; 29°18′57″N 96°06′05″W	Wharton	Historic and Architectural Resources of Wharton MPS
5	Colorado River Bridge	Colorado River Bridge	March 18, 1993 (#93000117)	S. Richmond Rd. (Old US 59) across the Colorado R. 29°18′30″N 96°06′13″W	Wharton	Historic and Architectural Resources of Wharton MPS
6	Wiley J. Croom House	Wiley J. Croom House	March 18, 1993 (#93000099)	205 E. Milam; 29°18′38″N 96°05′55″W	Wharton	Historic and Architectural Resources of Wharton MPS
7	F. F. Dannon House		March 18, 1993 (#93000095)	612 W. Caney; 29°18′49″N 96°06′19″W	Wharton	Historic and Architectural Resources of Wharton MPS
8	Dr. Green Davidson House	Dr. Green Davidson House	March 18, 1993 (#93000111)	404 Bolton; 29°18′56″N 96°06′07″W	Wharton	Historic and Architectural Resources of Wharton MPS
9	Ben and Mary Davis House	Ben and Mary Davis House	March 18, 1993 (#93000104)	100 S. Resident; 29°18′37″N 96°05′54″W	Wharton	Historic and Architectural Resources of Wharton MPS
10	Nettie Elkins House	Nettie Elkins House	March 18, 1993 (#93000114)	109 E. Alabama; 29°18′50″N 96°05′54″W	Wharton	Historic and Architectural Resources of Wharton MPS
11	E. Clyde and Mary Elliott House	E. Clyde and Mary Elliott House	March 18, 1993 (#93000122)	707 N. Walnut; 29°18′57″N 96°05′37″W	Wharton	Historic and Architectural Resources of Wharton MPS
12	Old First Methodist Episcopal Church South	Old First Methodist Episcopal Church South	March 18, 1993 (#93000097)	200 N. Fulton; 29°18′46″N 96°05′56″W	Wharton	Historic and Architectural Resources of Wharton MPS
13	Henry B. Garrett House	Henry B. Garrett House	March 18, 1993 (#93000098)	504 N. Fulton; 29°18′56″N 96°05′46″W	Wharton	Historic and Architectural Resources of Wharton MPS
14	John A. and Sophie Garrett House	John A. and Sophie Garrett House	March 18, 1993 (#93000115)	401 E. Alabama; 29°18′47″N 96°05′44″W	Wharton	Historic and Architectural Resources of Wharton MPS
15	George C. and Annie Gifford House	George C. and Annie Gifford House	March 18, 1993 (#93000096)	615 W. Caney; 29°18′47″N 96°06′20″W	Wharton	Historic and Architectural Resources of Wharton MPS
16	Joseph Andrew Hamilton House	Joseph Andrew Hamilton House	March 18, 1993 (#93000106)	325 N. Richmond; 29°18′53″N 96°06′09″W	Wharton	Recorded Texas Historic Landmark; Historic and Architectural Resources of Wharton MPS
17	Gerard A. Harrison House	Gerard A. Harrison House	March 18, 1993 (#93000112)	209 E. Caney; 29°18′42″N 96°05′53″W	Wharton	Historic and Architectural Resources of Wharton MPS
18	Harrison-Dennis House	Harrison-Dennis House	March 18, 1993 (#93000110)	409 W. Burleson; 29°18′38″N 96°06′13″W	Wharton	Historic and Architectural Resources of Wharton MPS
19	Edwin Hawes House	Edwin Hawes House	March 18, 1993 (#93000102)	309 N. Resident; 29°18′45″N 96°05′50″W	Wharton	Recorded Texas Historic Landmark
20	Edwin Hawes Jr. House		March 18, 1993 (#93000105)	119 S. Resident; 29°18′34″N 96°05′51″W	Wharton	Historic and Architectural Resources of Wharton MPS; demolished
21	House at 401 North Richmond	House at 401 North Richmond	March 18, 1993 (#93000107)	401 N. Richmond; 29°18′54″N 96°06′08″W	Wharton	Historic and Architectural Resources of Wharton MPS
22	House at 512 North Resident	House at 512 North Resident	March 18, 1993 (#93000103)	512 N. Resident; 29°18′54″N 96°05′43″W	Wharton	Historic and Architectural Resources of Wharton MPS
23	Linn Street Historic District	Linn Street Historic District	March 18, 1993 (#93000124)	Roughly, the 500 blocks of Richmond Rd. and Houston St. and the 100-200 blocks of Linn St. 29°18′56″N 96°05′59″W	Wharton	Historic and Architectural Resources of Wharton MPS
24	Merrell-Roten House	Merrell-Roten House	March 18, 1993 (#93000113)	520 Ave. A 29°18′56″N 96°05′34″W	Wharton	Historic and Architectural Resources of Wharton MPS
25	Moran-Moore House	Moran-Moore House	March 18, 1993 (#93000120)	501 N. Walnut; 29°18′51″N 96°05′40″W	Wharton	Historic and Architectural Resources of Wharton MPS
26	J. H. Speaker House	J. H. Speaker House	March 18, 1993 (#93000109)	414 E. Alabama; 29°18′45″N 96°05′42″W	Wharton	Historic and Architectural Resources of Wharton MPS
27	St. John's Evangelical Lutheran Church	St. John's Evangelical Lutheran Church	March 18, 1993 (#93000100)	612 N. Pecan; 29°18′55″N 96°05′40″W	Wharton	Historic and Architectural Resources of Wharton MPS
28	Texas and New Orleans Railroad Bridge	Texas and New Orleans Railroad Bridge	March 18, 1993 (#93000123)	Southern Pacific RR tracks, 0.25 mi (0.40 km). W of Old US 59, over the Colorado R. 29°18′26″N 96°06′23″W	Wharton	Historic and Architectural Resources of Wharton MPS
29	Texas and New Orleans Railroad Depot	Texas and New Orleans Railroad Depot	March 18, 1993 (#93000119)	100 block of N. Sunset; 29°18′49″N 96°06′23″W	Wharton	Historic and Architectural Resources of Wharton MPS
30	West Milam Street Mercantile Historic District	West Milam Street Mercantile Historic District	March 18, 1993 (#93000125)	Roughly 637-668 W. Milam St. 29°18′46″N 96°06′23″W	Wharton	Historic and Architectural Resources of Wharton MPS
31	Wharton County Courthouse Historic Commercial District	Wharton County Courthouse Historic Commercial District	November 5, 1991 (#91001624)	Roughly bounded by the alley N of Milam St., Rusk St., Elm St. and Richmond St. 29°18′38″N 96°06′03″W	Wharton	Includes State Antiquities Landmarks, Recorded Texas Historic Landmark
32	Louis F. Worthing House	Louis F. Worthing House	March 18, 1993 (#93000121)	620 N. Walnut; 29°18′55″N 96°05′36″W	Wharton	Historic and Architectural Resources of Wharton MPS

== See also ==
- National Register of Historic Places listings in Texas
- Recorded Texas Historic Landmarks in Wharton County
