= West Harrison High School =

Location
- 10399 County Farm Road; Gulfport, MS 39503; United States; 30.4348°N 89.1948°W

Information
- Type: High School
- Motto: "Strive for Excellence"
- Established: 2008
- School district: Harrison County School District
- Superintendent: William Bentz
- Principal: Brandon Waltman
- Staff: 64.98 (FTE)
- Grades: 9–12
- Enrollment: 1,154 (2023–2024)
- Student to teacher ratio: 17.76
- Colors: Green and orange
- Team name: Hurricanes
- Communities served: West Harrison County
- Feeder schools: West Harrison Middle
- Website: whh.harrison.k12.ms.us

West Harrison High School is a public high school located in Gulfport, Mississippi, United States. Opened in 2008, it includes a reinforced storm shelter with a 2000-person capacity built as part of a $9 million FEMA grant. The principal is Brandon Waltman. The school has been back-to-back #1 in the state of Mississippi in accountability ratings for 2022 and 2023.

The West Harrison High School Hurricane Band, The Pride of South Mississippi was selected to march down Colorado Blvd. in Pasadena, CA for the 2020 Rose Parade. This marks the second time in twenty years that a high school band from Mississippi to participate in the parade.
