= Sentinel Spire =

Sandstone pillar in Mesa County, Colorado, United States

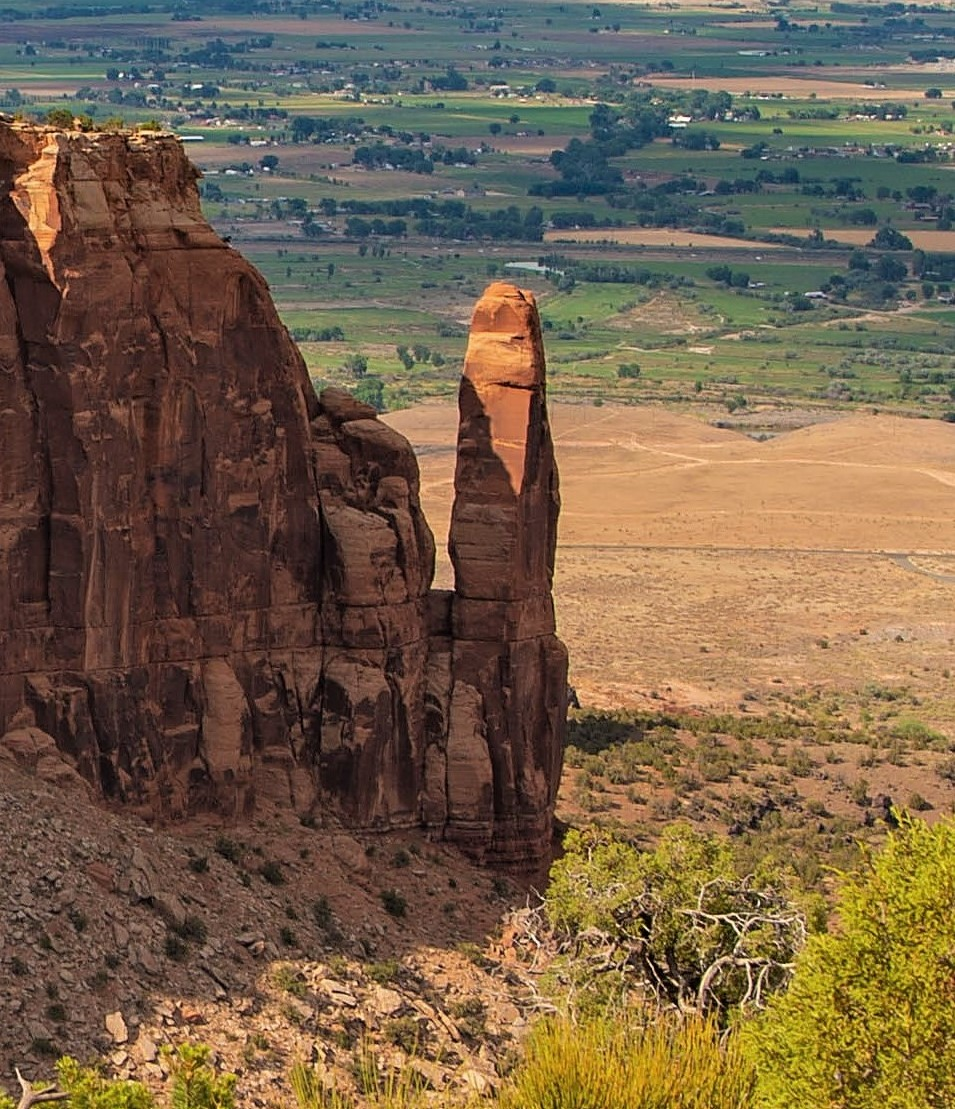
- Southwest aspect

Highest point
- Elevation: 5,500 ft (1,676 m)
- Prominence: 180 ft (55 m)
- Parent peak: The Island
- Isolation: 0.48 mi (0.77 km)
- Coordinates: 39°06′11″N 108°43′34″W

Geography
- Location within Colorado Location within the United States
- Country: United States
- State: Colorado
- County: Mesa
- Protected area: Colorado National Monument
- Parent range: Colorado Plateau; Uncompahgre Plateau
- Topo map: USGS Colorado National Monument

Geology
- Rock age: Late Triassic to Early Jurassic
- Rock type: Wingate Sandstone

Climbing
- First ascent: May 3, 1960
- Easiest route: class 5.10+ climbing

Sentinel Spire is a 5,500-foot-elevation (1,700-meter) sandstone pillar located in Colorado National Monument, in Mesa County of western Colorado, United States. This 200-foot freestanding tower is situated in Wedding Canyon, one-half mile east of the monument's visitor center, and 9 miles (14 km) west of the community of Grand Junction. It is also immediately south of Window Rock, and north of another climbing destination, Pipe Organ, both of which can be seen from viewpoints along Rim Rock Drive. The first ascent of the summit was made May 3, 1960, by Layton Kor, Harvey Carter, and John Auld via the class 5.10 route, Fast Draw. This was the day before the climbers also made the first ascent of nearby Kissing Couple. The first solo ascent was made by Ron Olevsky in March 1976, and the first free ascent was made by Andy Petefish and John Christenson in 1978. Some climbers refer to Sentinel Spire as Watusi Spear.

== Geology ==
This tower is composed primarily of cliff-forming Wingate Sandstone, which consists of wind-borne, cross-bedded quartzose sandstones deposited as ancient sand dunes approximately 200 million years ago in the Late Triassic. The slope around the base of Sentinel Spire is Chinle Formation. The floor of the canyon is Precambrian basement rock consisting of gneiss, schist, and granites. Precipitation runoff from this geographical feature drains to the Colorado River, approximately 1.5 miles to the northeast.

== Climate ==
According to the Köppen climate classification system, Sentinel Spire is located in a semi-arid climate zone. Summers are hot and dry, while winters are cold with some snow. Temperatures reach 100 °F (38 °C) on 5.3 days, 90 °F (32 °C) on 57 days, and remain at or below freezing on 13 days annually. The months April through October offer the most favorable weather to visit.

== Climbing ==
Established rock climbing routes at Sentinel Spire:

- Fast Draw – class 5.10c – 2 pitches – First ascent 1960
- Medicine Man – class 5.12c – 4 pitches
- Vision Quest – class 5.11+ – 2 pitches

== See also ==
- List of rock formations in the United States

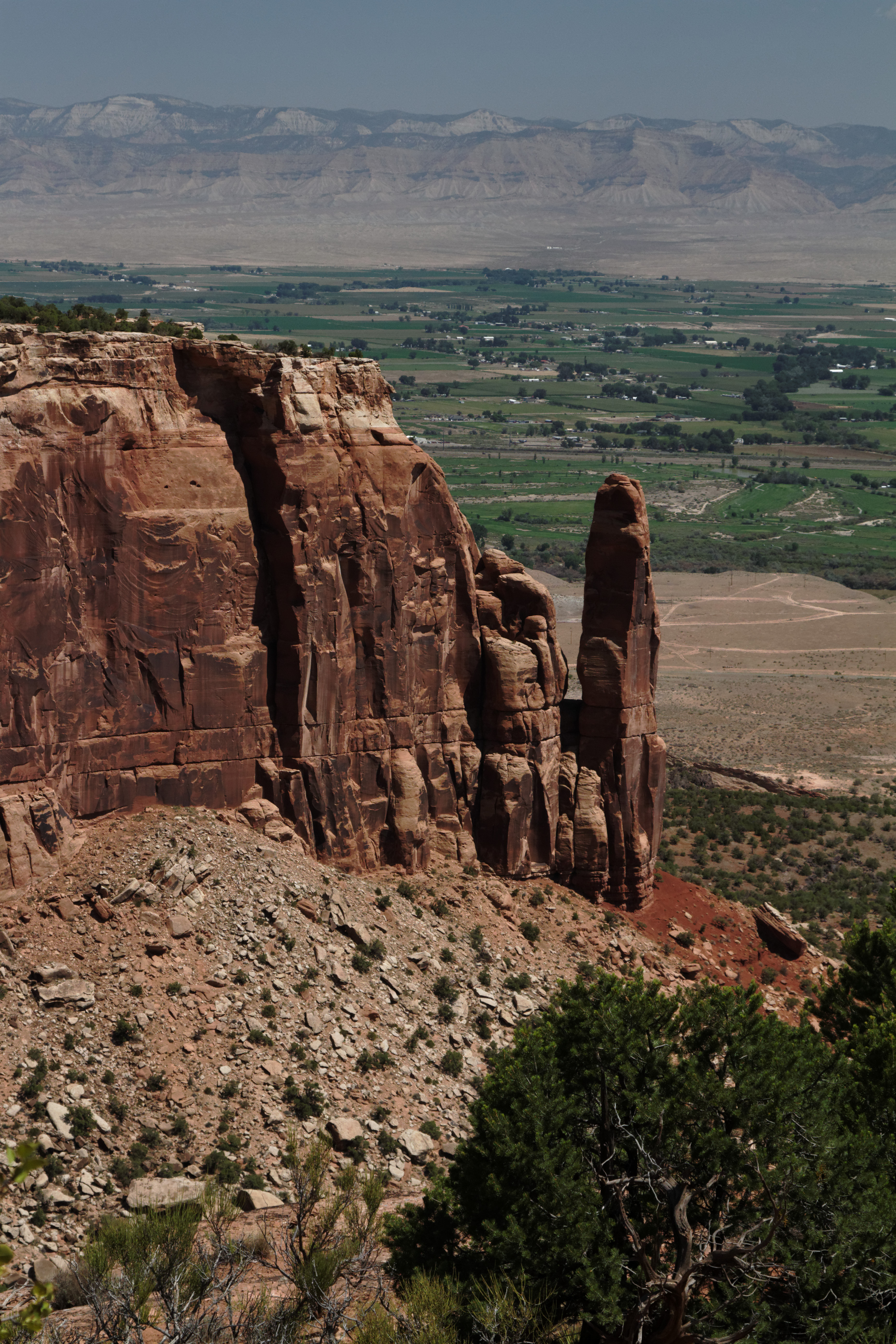
