= Grand View Spire =

Sandstone formation in Colorado

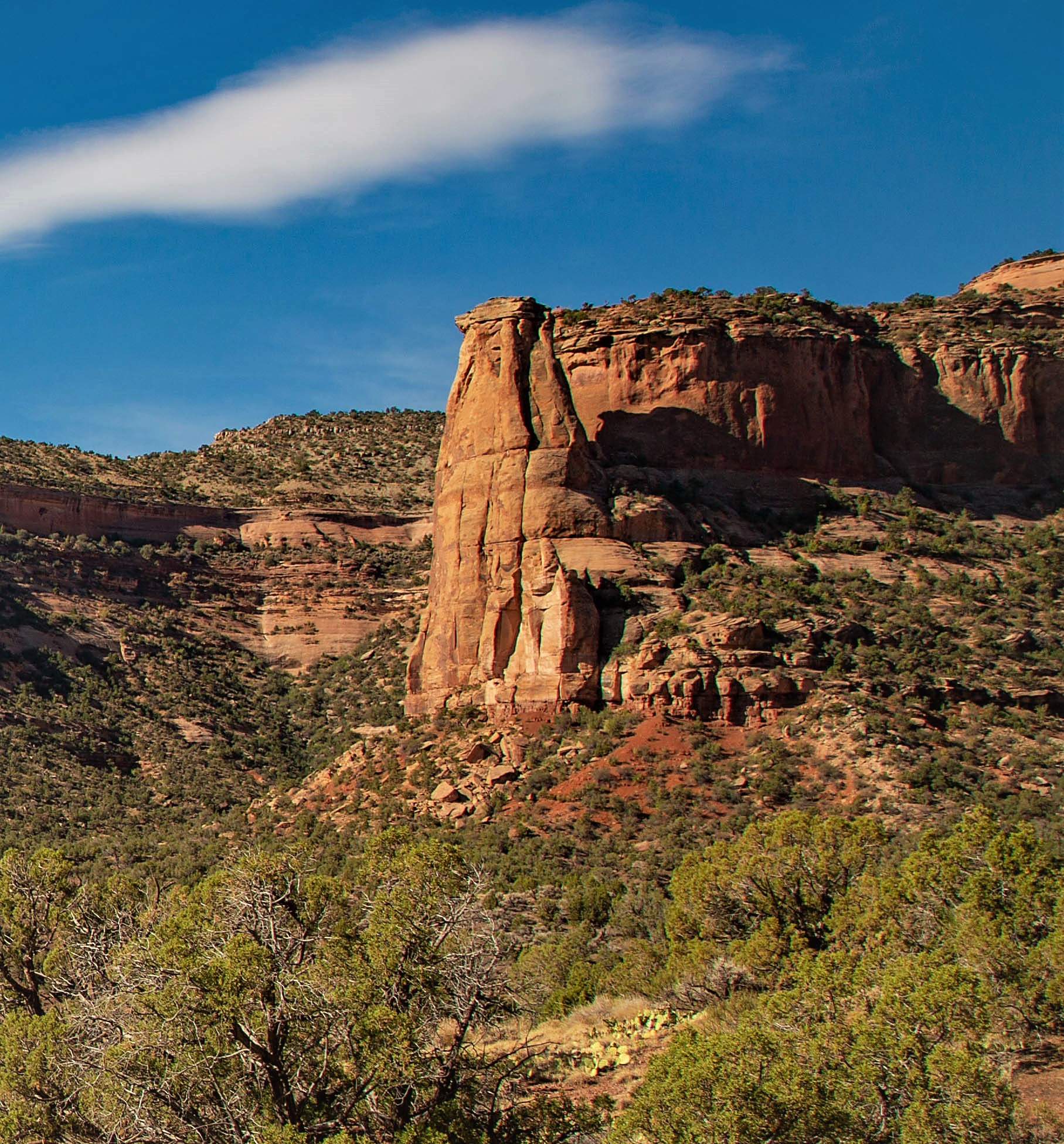
- East aspect

Highest point
- Elevation: 5,821 ft (1,774 m)
- Prominence: 161 ft (49 m)
- Parent peak: Black Ridge
- Isolation: 2.21 mi (3.56 km)
- Coordinates: 39°05′28″N 108°43′22″W

Geography
- Location within Colorado Location within the United States
- Country: United States
- State: Colorado
- County: Mesa
- Protected area: Colorado National Monument
- Parent range: Colorado Plateau; Uncompahgre Plateau
- Topo map: USGS Colorado National Monument

Geology
- Rock age: Late Triassic to Early Jurassic
- Rock type: Wingate Sandstone

Climbing
- First ascent: 1961
- Easiest route: class 5.8 A2 climbing

Grand View Spire is a 5,821-foot-elevation (1,774-meter) sandstone pillar located in Colorado National Monument, in Mesa County of western Colorado, United States. This 400-foot tower is situated on the west side of Monument Canyon, one mile southeast of the monument's visitor center, and 9 miles (14 km) west of the community of Grand Junction. It is also 0.32 mile immediately south of Independence Monument, and 0.27 mile northwest of another climbing destination, Kissing Couple. Its unofficial name relates to its position at the tip of Grand View Overlook, one of several scenic viewpoints along Rim Rock Drive.

== Geology ==
The spire is composed primarily of cliff-forming Wingate Sandstone, which consists of wind-borne, cross-bedded quartzose sandstones deposited as ancient sand dunes approximately 200 million years ago in the Late Triassic. The caprock at the summit consists of fluvial sandstones of the resistant Kayenta Formation. The slope around the base of Grand View Spire is Chinle Formation. The floor of the canyon is Precambrian basement rock consisting of gneiss, schist, and granites. Precipitation runoff from this geographical feature drains to the Colorado River, approximately three miles to the northeast.

== Climate ==
According to the Köppen climate classification system, Grand View Spire is located in a semi-arid climate zone. Summers are hot and dry, while winters are cold with some snow. Temperatures reach 100 °F (38 °C) on 5.3 days, 90 °F (32 °C) on 57 days, and remain at or below freezing on 13 days annually. The months April through October offer the most favorable weather to visit.

== Climbing ==
Established rock climbing routes on Grand View Spire:

- Southwest Defile Route – class 5.8 C2 – 3 pitches – First ascent 1961 by John Auld, John Kuglin, Gary Ziegler
- Relics – class 5.10 – 5 pitches – FA November 13, 1991, by Mike Baker, Michael Kennedy, Bob Wade

== See also ==
- List of rock formations in the United States

== Gallery ==
Grand View Spire in foreground as seen from Grand View Overlook.
("The Island" in the distance.)

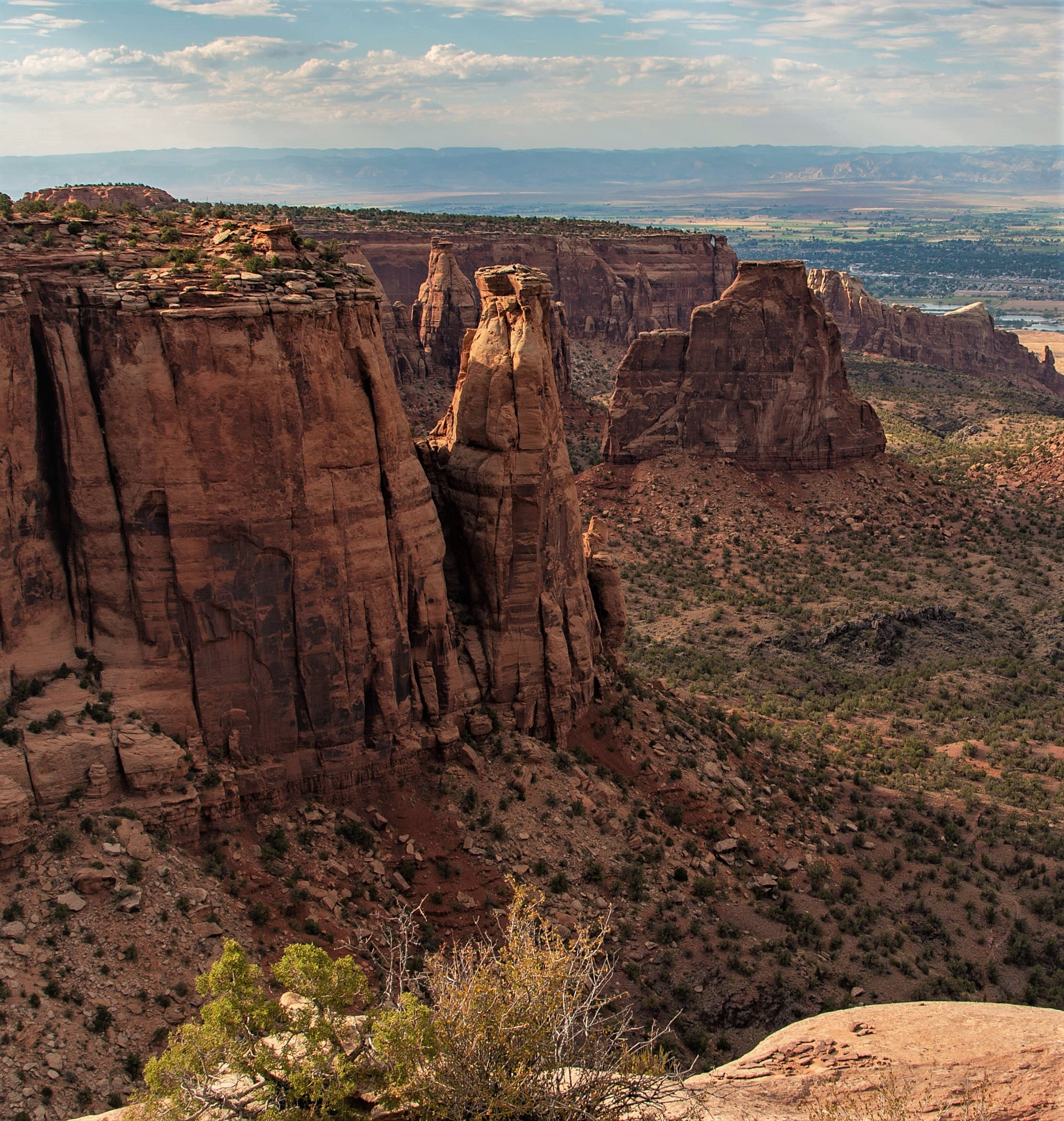
Grand View Spire centered, with Independence Monument to right

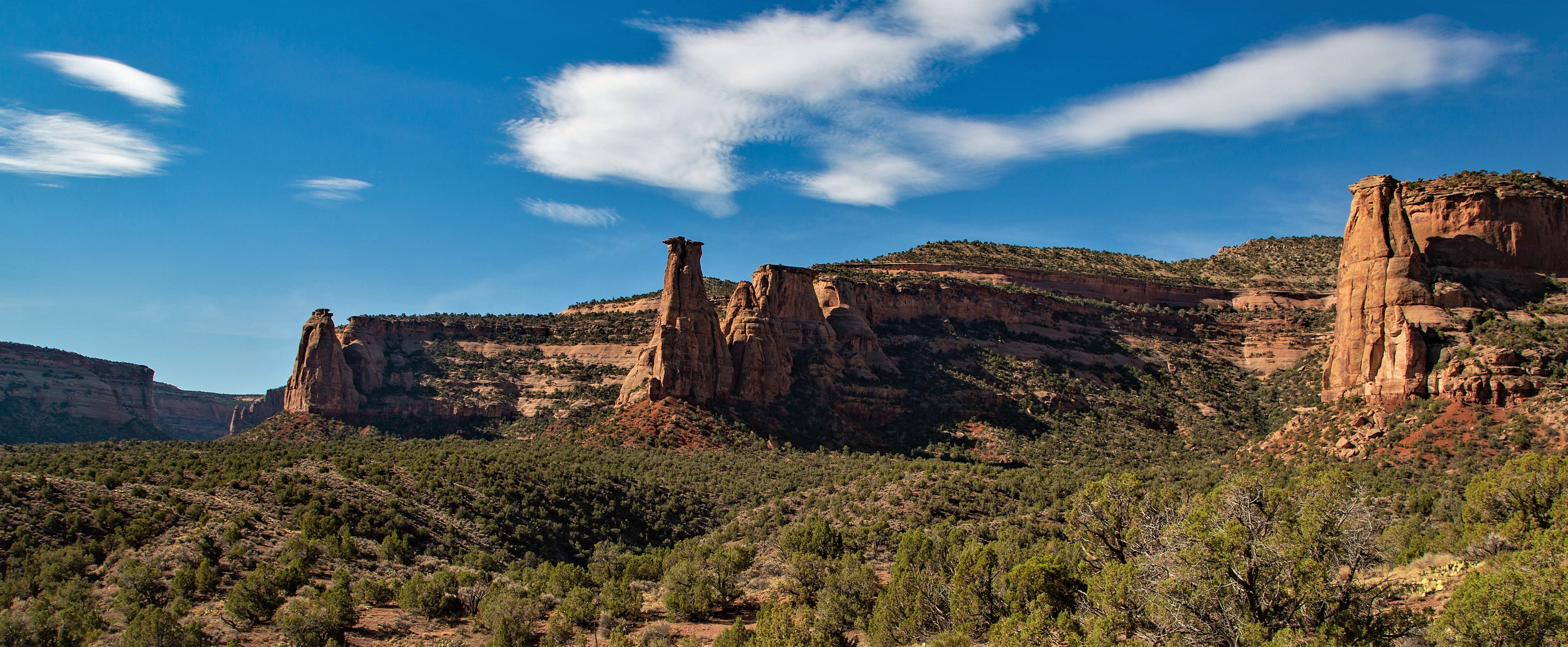
Egypt Rock (left), Kissing Couple (center), Grand View Spire (right)
as seen from Monument Canyon

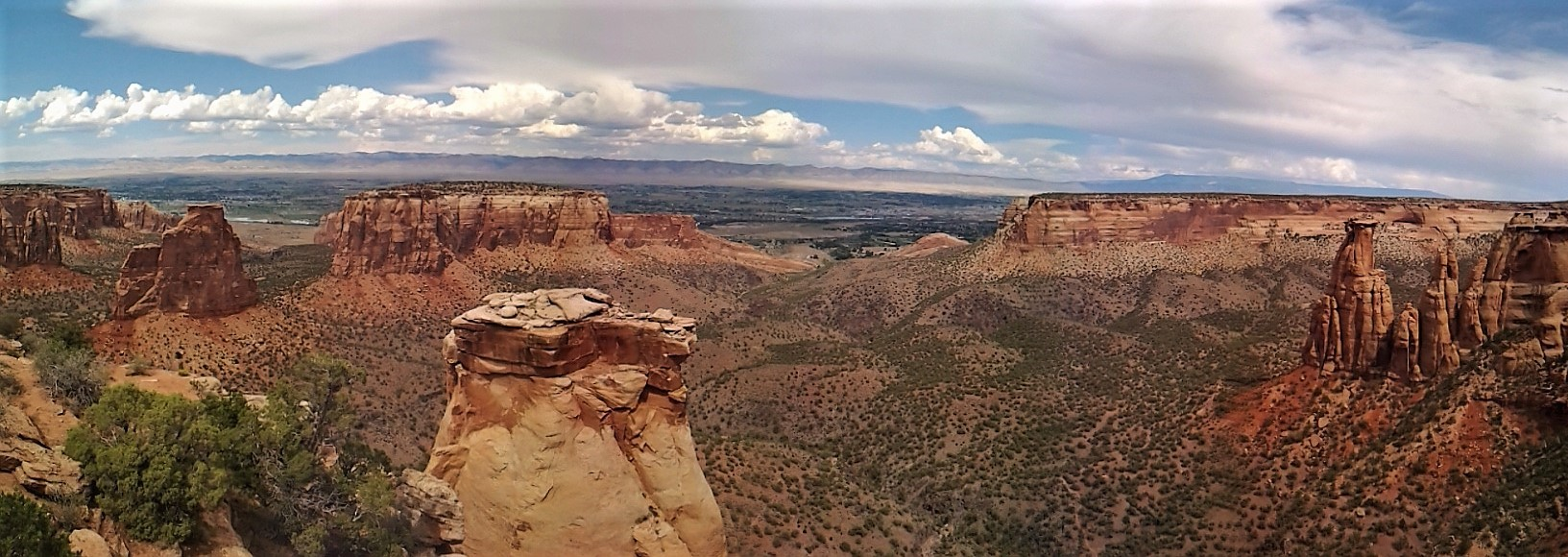
Grand View overlook.
L to R: Independence Monument, The Island, Grand View Spire, Kissing Couple.

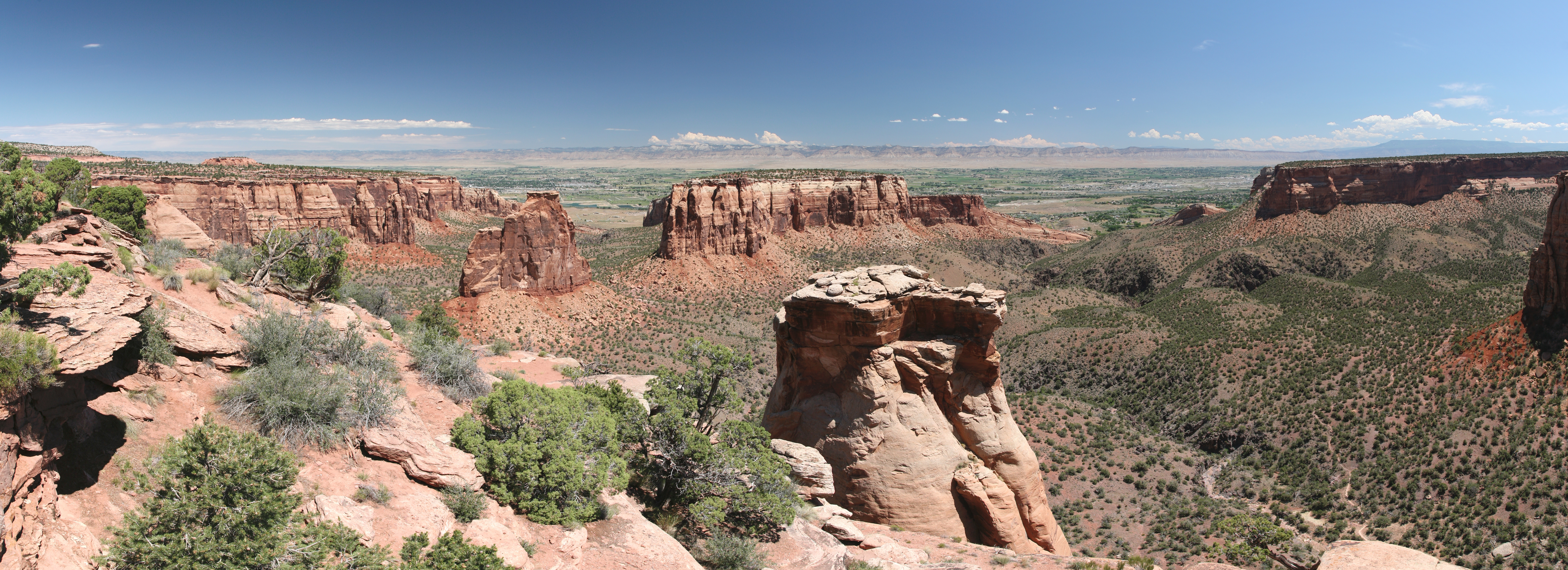
Grand View Spire in foreground as seen from Grand View Overlook

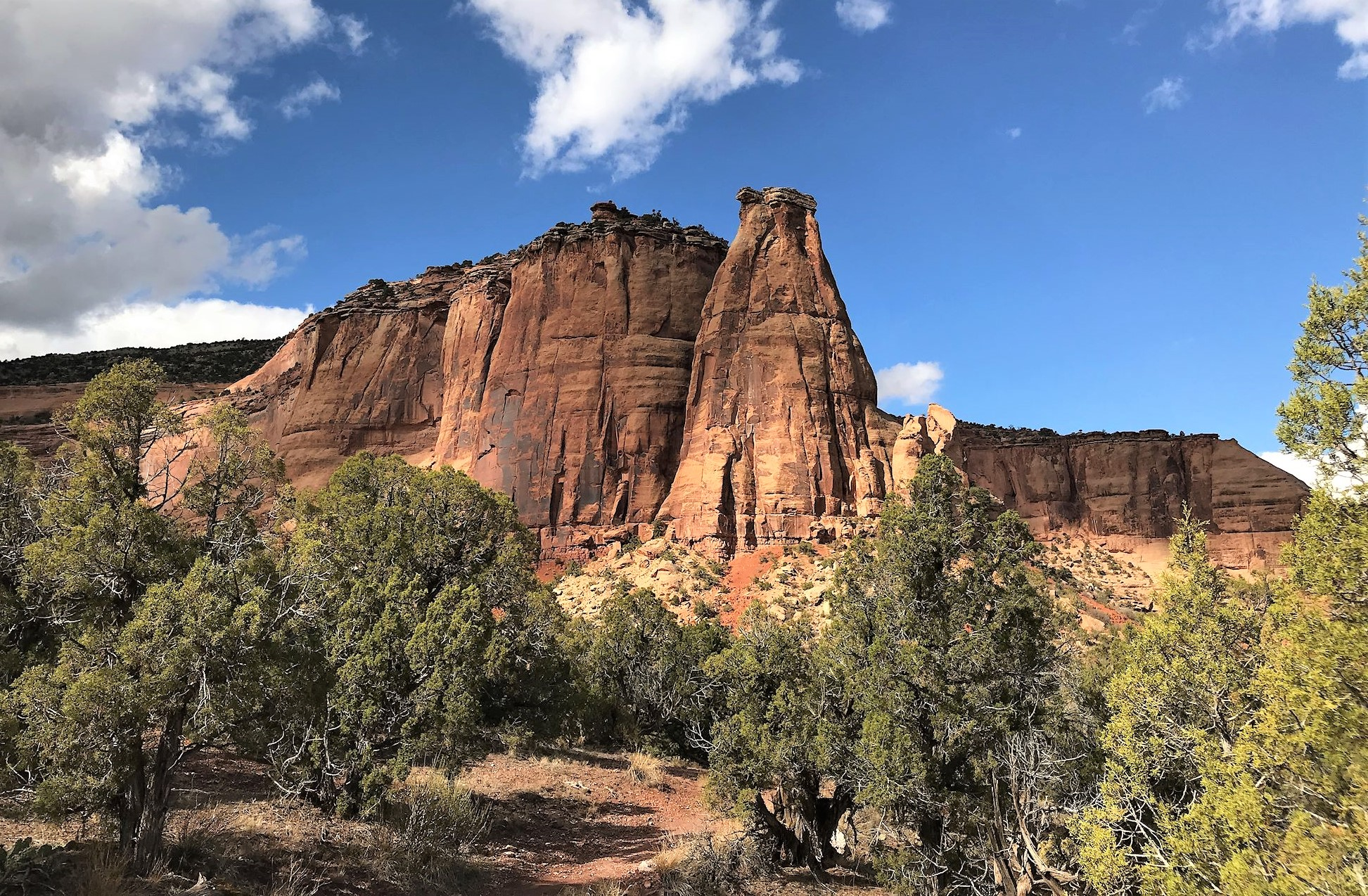
