= Pipe Organ (Colorado National Monument) =

Sandstone pillar in Mesa County, Colorado, United States

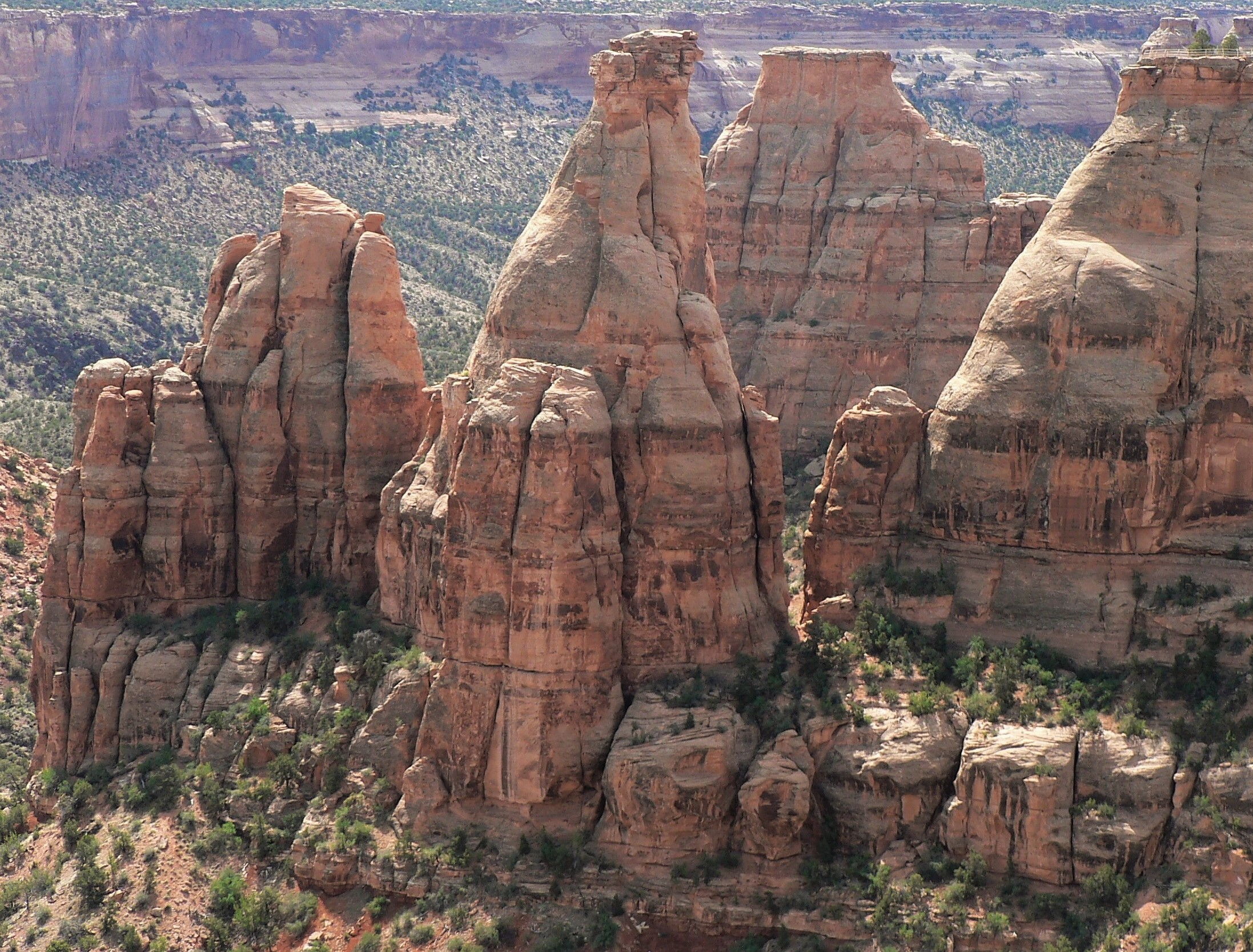
- Northwest aspect

Highest point
- Elevation: 5,731 ft (1,747 m)
- Prominence: 241 ft (73 m)
- Parent peak: Independence Monument
- Isolation: 0.28 mi (0.45 km)
- Coordinates: 39°05′56″N 108°43′34″W

Geography
- Location within Colorado Location within the United States
- Country: United States
- State: Colorado
- County: Mesa
- Protected area: Colorado National Monument
- Parent range: Colorado Plateau; Uncompahgre Plateau
- Topo map: USGS Colorado National Monument

Geology
- Rock age: Late Triassic to Early Jurassic
- Rock type: Wingate Sandstone

Climbing
- First ascent: January 31, 1961
- Easiest route: class 5.10 C1 climbing

Pipe Organ is a 5,731-foot-elevation (1,747-meter) sandstone pillar located in Colorado National Monument, in Mesa County of western Colorado, United States. This 400+ foot tower is situated in Wedding Canyon, less than one-half mile east of the monument's visitor center, and 9 miles (14 km) west of the community of Grand Junction. It is also immediately northwest of another popular climbing destination, Independence Monument, and both can be seen from viewpoints along Rim Rock Drive. The first ascent of the summit was made January 31, 1961, by John Auld, Gary Ziegler, Jim Dyson, and John Kuglin. Pipe Organ has a subsidiary summit unofficially named Organ Pipe Spire on the east aspect, which the National Park Service refers to as Praying Hands. This 325-foot-high subsidiary peak was originally named Squall Spire in 1976 by Harvey T. Carter of the first ascent party.

== Geology ==
This tower is the remnant of a differentially eroded fin composed primarily of cliff-forming Wingate Sandstone, which consists of wind-borne, cross-bedded quartzose sandstones deposited as ancient sand dunes approximately 200 million years ago in the Late Triassic. The thin caprock at the summit consists of fluvial sandstones of the resistant Kayenta Formation. The slope around the base of Pipe Organ is Chinle Formation. The floor of the canyon is Precambrian basement rock consisting of gneiss, schist, and granites. Precipitation runoff from this geographical feature drains to the Colorado River, approximately two miles to the northeast.

== Climate ==
According to the Köppen climate classification system, Pipe Organ is located in a semi-arid climate zone. Summers are hot and dry, while winters are cold with some snow. Temperatures reach 100 °F (38 °C) on 5.3 days, 90 °F (32 °C) on 57 days, and remain at or below freezing on 13 days annually. The months April through October offer the most favorable weather to visit.

== Gallery ==
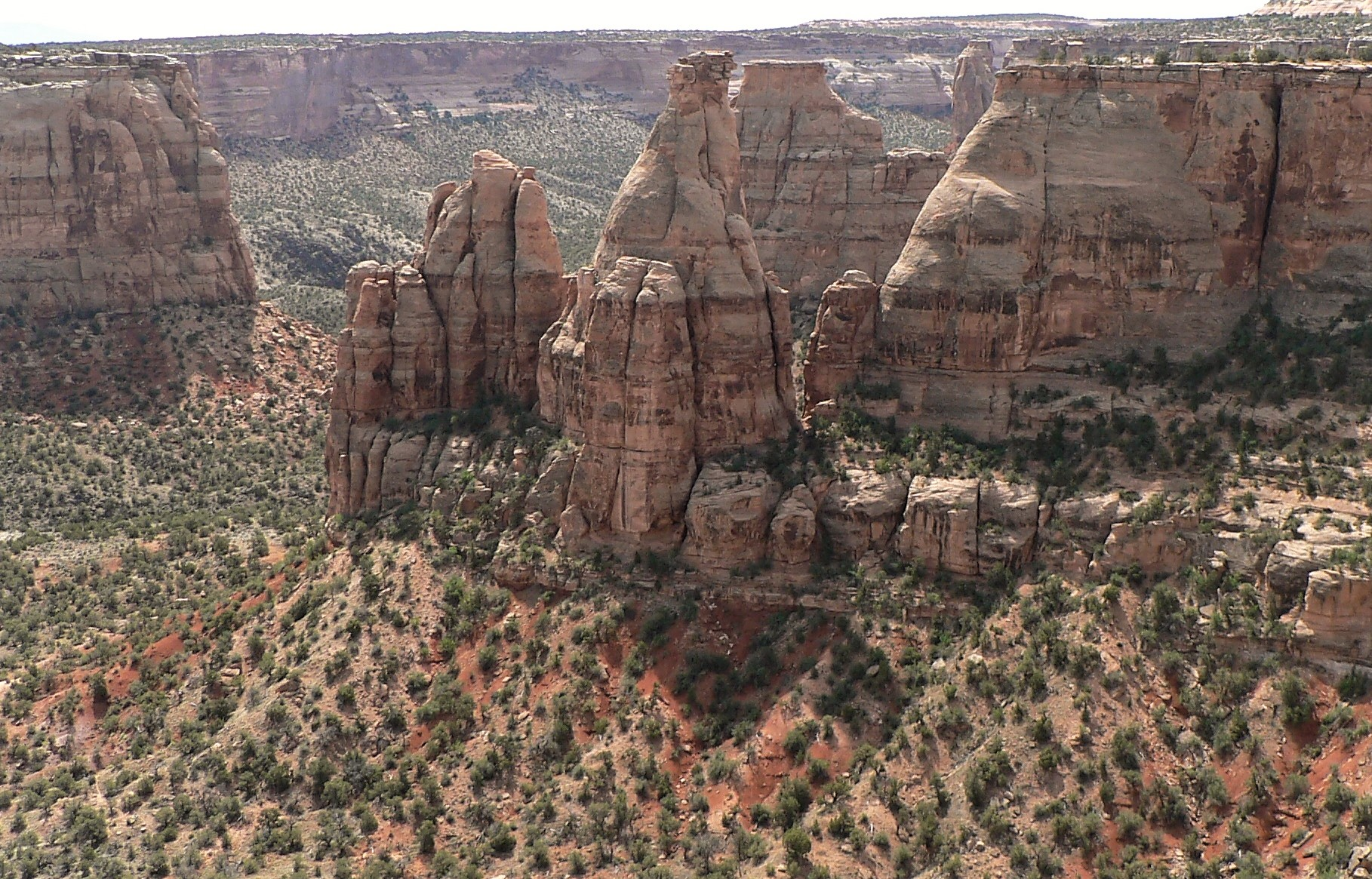
Pipe Organ centered with the lower Organ Pipe Spire to immediate left

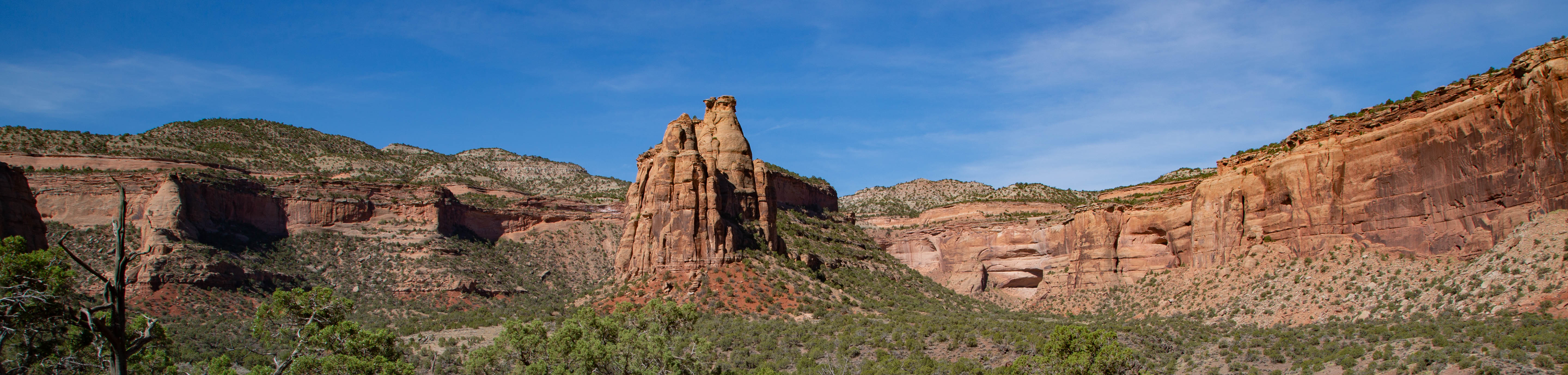
East aspect

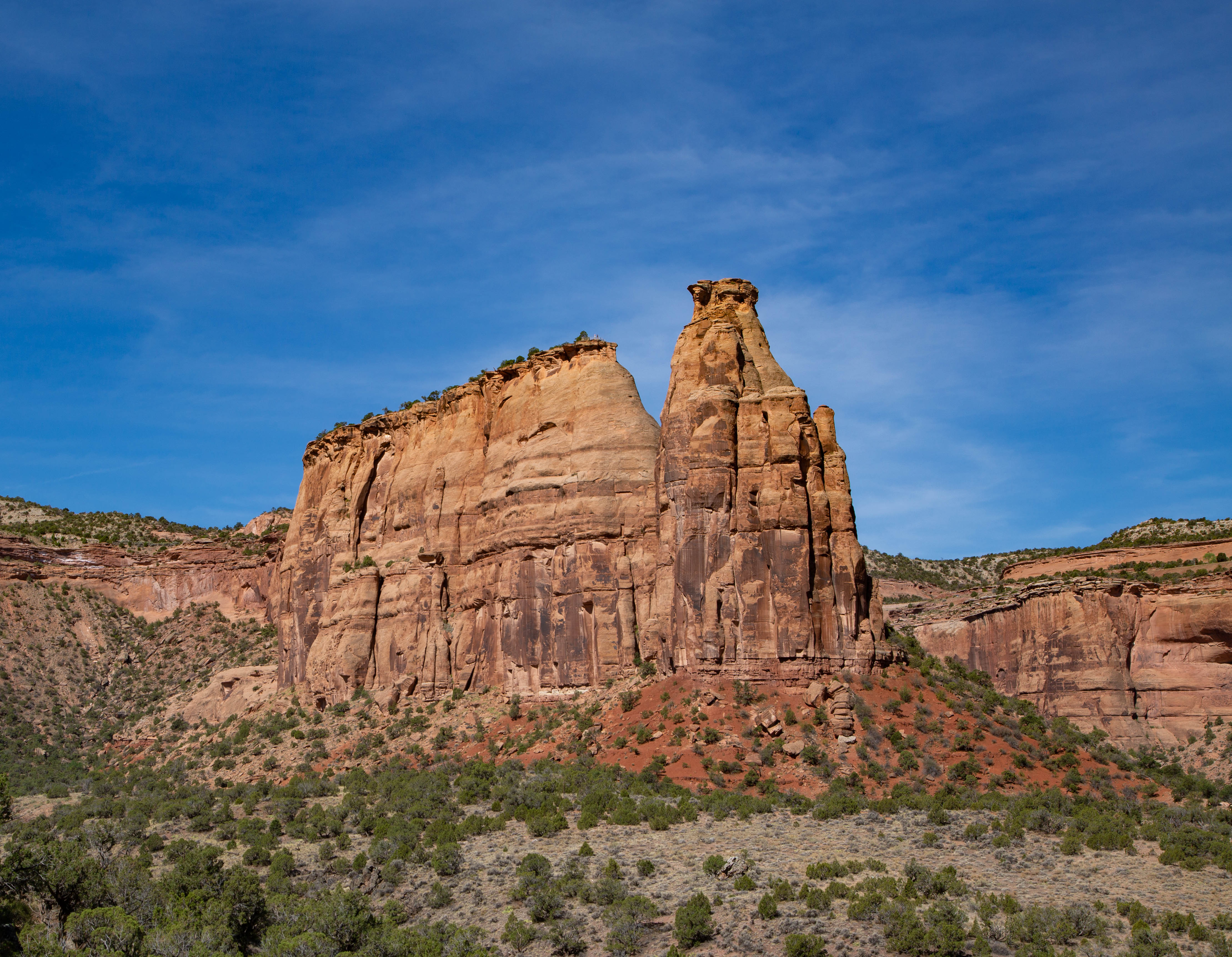
Southeast aspect

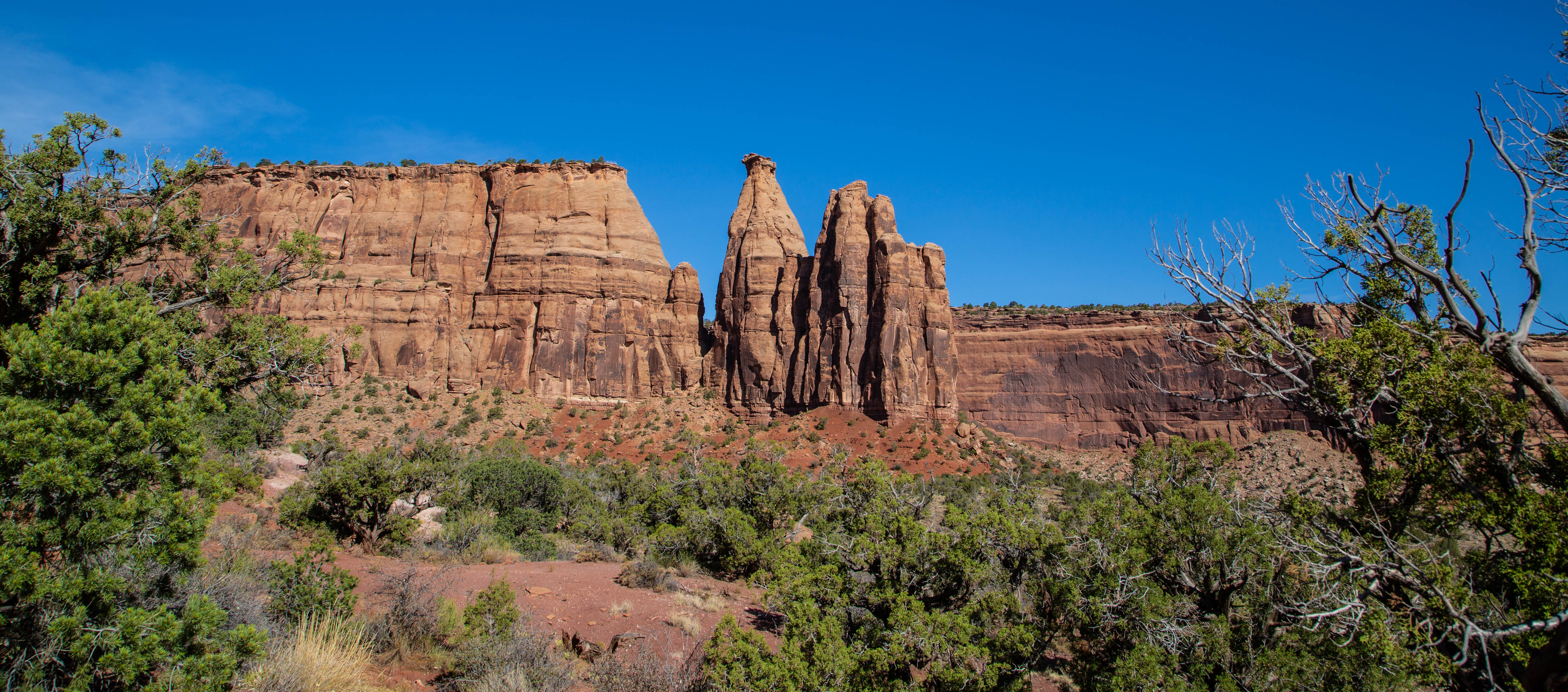
South aspect

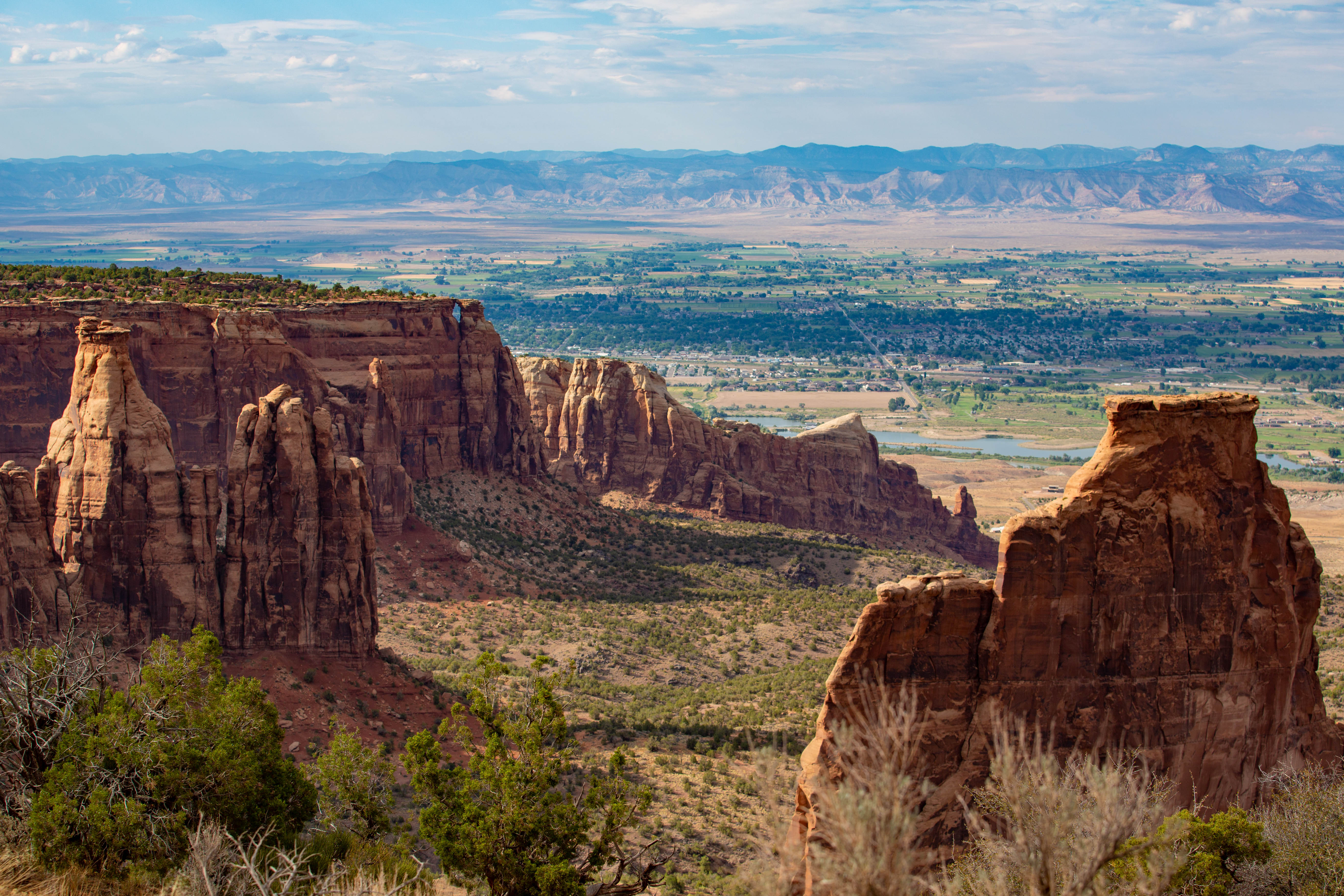
Pipe Organ (left), Independence Monument (right) from Rim Rock Drive

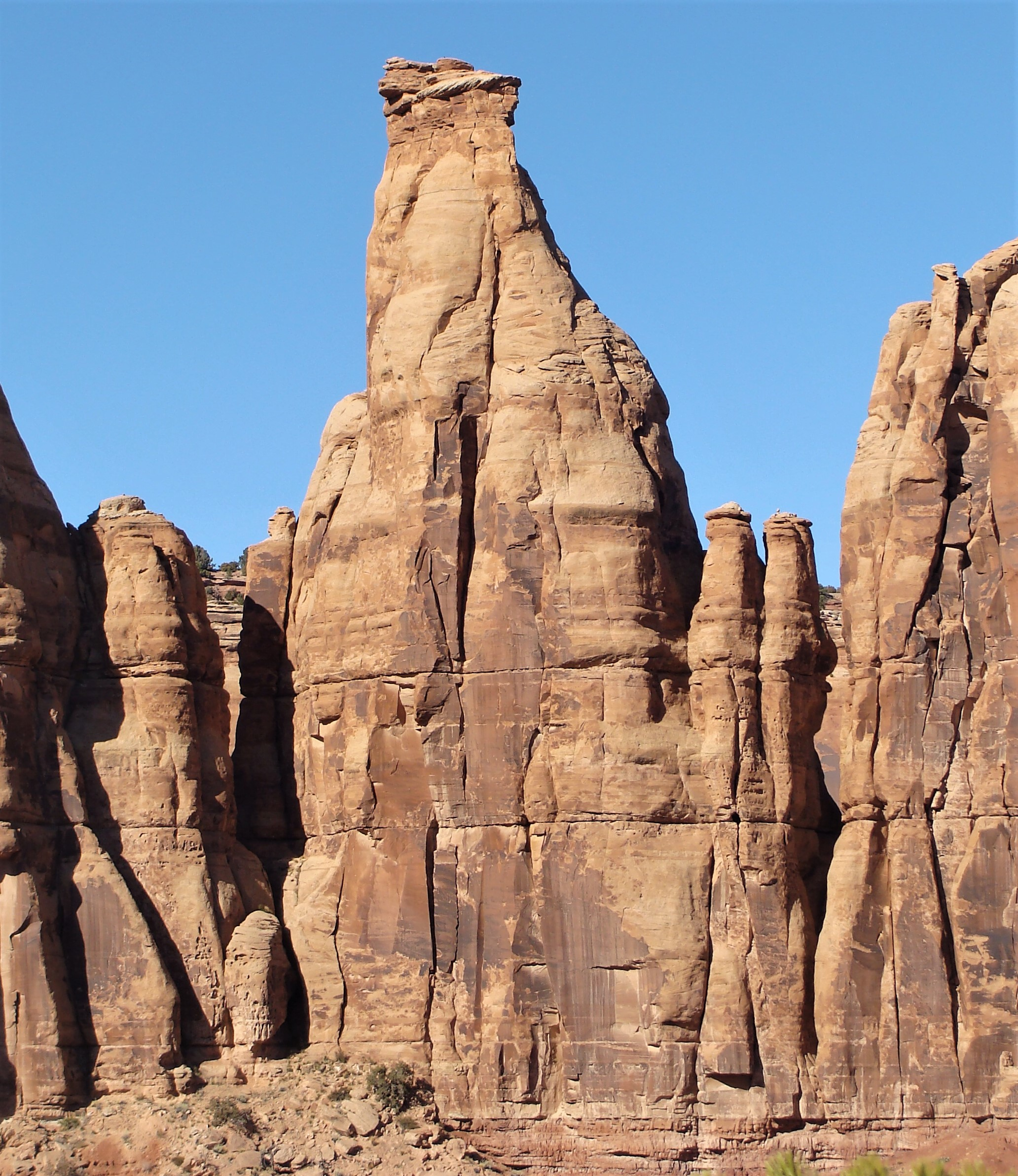
South aspect

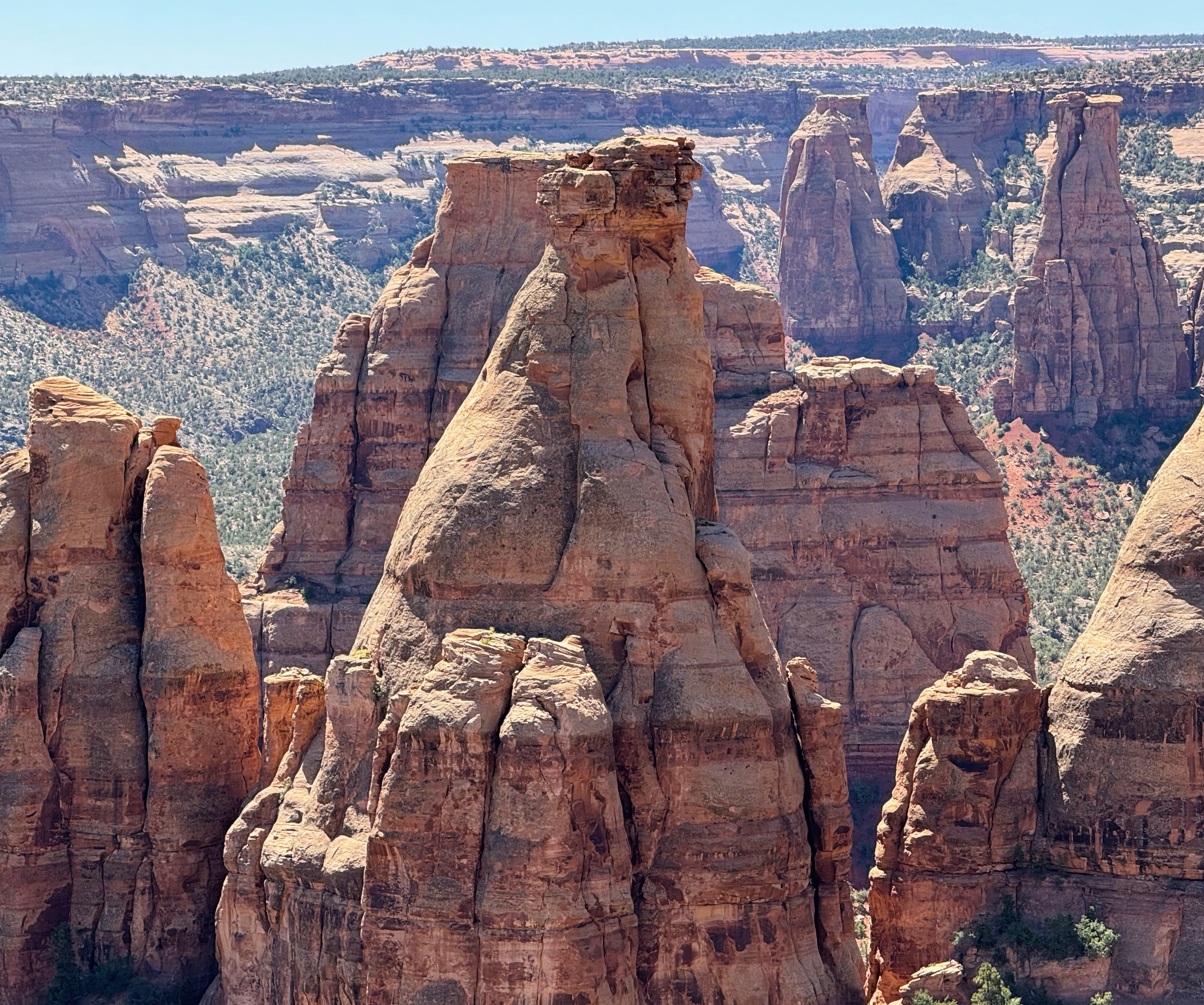
Northwest aspect

== Climbing ==
Established rock climbing routes on Pipe Organ and Organ Pipe Spire:

- Southeast – class 5.10 C1 – 3 pitches – First Ascent 1961
- Southwest Face – class 5.10+ C2 – 3 pitches
- Organ Pipe Spire – class 5.8+ – 2 pitches
- Sirocco – class 5.9 – FA 1976
- Pipe Dream – class 5.11+ – 5 pitches – FA 2005
- Aces & Eights – class 5.12 C2 – 4 pitches
- Ender's Game – class 5.10 – 3 pitches
- The Weird Fun – class 5.10 – 3 pitches

== See also ==
- List of rock formations in the United States
- Kissing Couple
- Sentinel Spire
