= Independence Monument (Colorado) =

Rock formation in Mesa County, Colorado, US

- Independence Rock
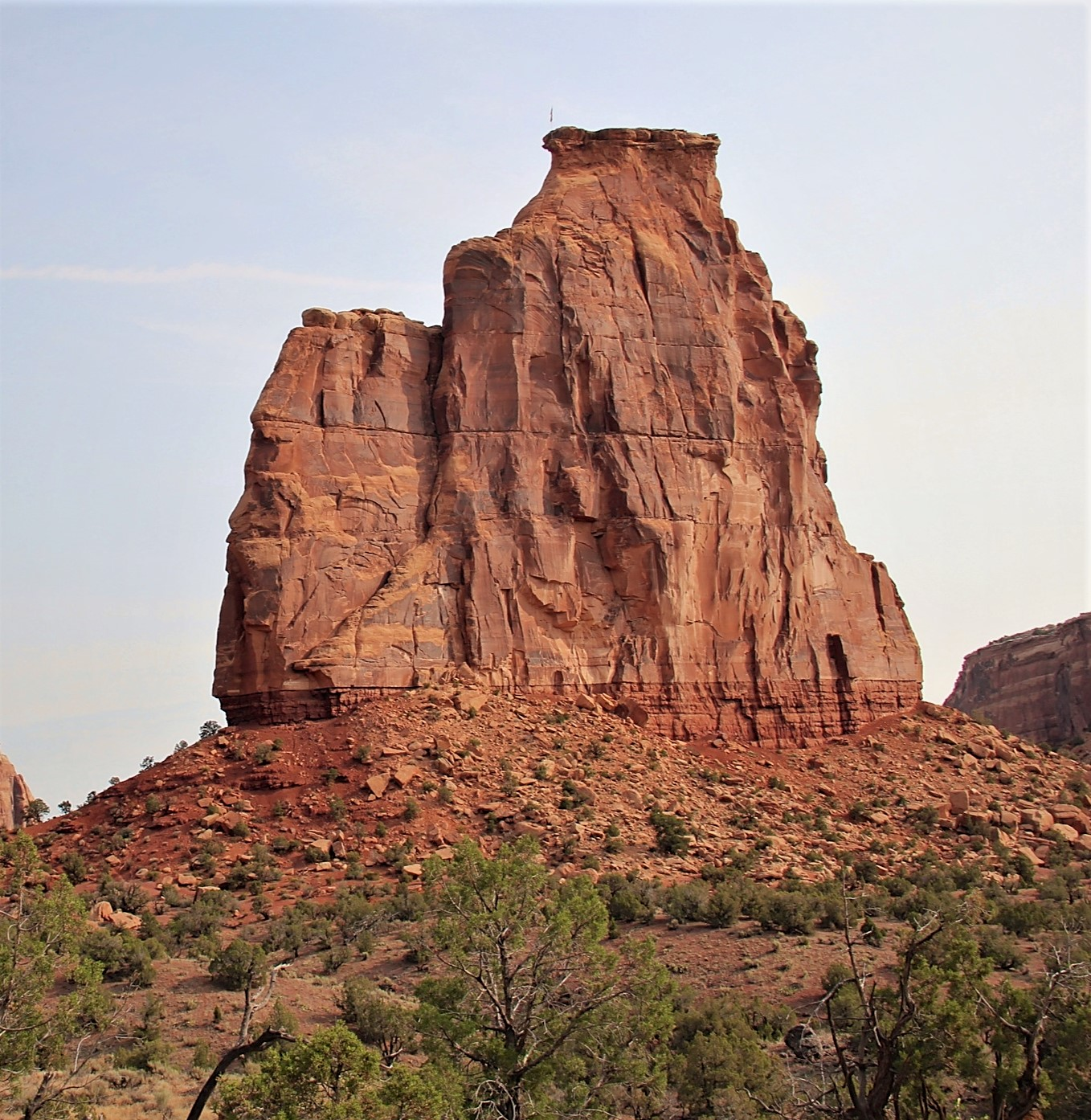
- South aspect

Highest point
- Elevation: 5,739 ft (1,749 m)
- Prominence: 379 ft (116 m)
- Parent peak: The Island (5,770 ft)
- Isolation: 0.26 mi (0.42 km)
- Coordinates: 39°05′45″N 108°43′24″W

Geography
- Location within Colorado Location within the United States
- Country: United States
- State: Colorado
- County: Mesa
- Protected area: Colorado National Monument
- Parent range: Colorado Plateau; Uncompahgre Plateau
- Topo map: USGS Colorado National Monument

Geology
- Rock age: Late Triassic to Early Jurassic
- Rock type: Wingate Sandstone

Climbing
- First ascent: June 14, 1911 John Otto
- Easiest route: class 5.9- climbing

Independence Monument is a 5,739-foot-elevation (1,749-meter) sandstone pillar located in Colorado National Monument, in Mesa County of western Colorado, United States. This iconic 450-foot-high landmark is situated one mile southeast of the monument's visitor center, and 9 miles (14 km) west of the community of Grand Junction, where it towers above the floor of Monument Canyon and Wedding Canyon. It is a popular climbing destination, and can be seen from Rim Rock Drive.

== History ==
John Otto first arrived in the Grand Junction area in 1906. He lived alone in the canyons and used a pick and shovel to carve out trails. Otto is remembered as Colorado National Monument's founder, and its first custodian. A fervent patriot, he named the rock features after great heroes and historic events, with Independence Monument still bearing the name he bestowed.

John Otto made the first ascent of Independence Monument on June 14, 1911, flying Old Glory from the summit for Flag Day. That flag was presented to Otto by President William Howard Taft. Subsequently, he would make the ascent on July 4 each year to again display the flag to celebrate Independence Day, although his method differed from contemporary rock climbing. His method involved drilling holes and pounding in pieces of pipe to create a ladder. The pipes Otto attached were removed in the mid-1950s by the Park Service, but handholds and steps which he carved into the sandstone remain. John Otto married Boston artist Beatrice Farnham on June 20, 1911, at the base of Independence Monument in Wedding Canyon.

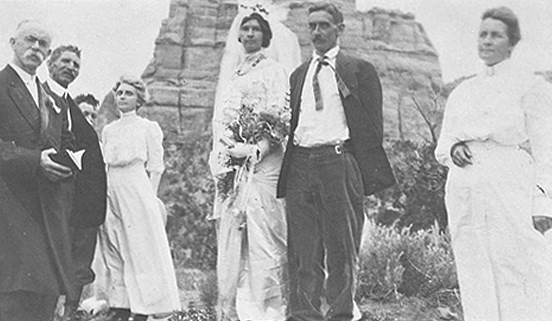
Otto's 1911 wedding at Independence Monument

It has become an annual tradition among climbers to raise the flag on the summit on July 4 each year.

== Climbing ==
Established rock climbing routes on Independence Monument:

- Otto's Route – class 5.8+ – 5 pitches – First Ascent 1911 (by John Otto)
- Independence Chimney – class 5.8 – 6 pitches – FA 1970 (by Mike Dudley and Fletcher Smith)
- South Face Direct – class 5.9 – 5 pitches – FA 1971 (by Mike Dudley, Art Howells, Don Doucette)
- Sundial Dihedral – class 5.11b – 6 pitches – FA 1986 (by Ed Webster and Peter Athans)
- Dependence – class 5.10+ – 5 pitches – FA 1994 (by Jon Butler, Cam Burns, and Luke Laeser)
- Geezer Highway – class 5.9+ – 6 pitches (by Mike Dudley and Dennis Willis)

== Geology ==
This monolith is the remnant of a differentially eroded fin composed primarily of cliff-forming Wingate Sandstone, which consists of wind-borne, cross-bedded quartzose sandstones deposited as ancient sand dunes approximately 200 million years ago in the Late Triassic. The thin caprock at the summit consists of fluvial sandstones of the resistant Kayenta Formation. The slope around the base of the Independence Monument is Chinle Formation. The floor of the canyon is Precambrian basement rock consisting of gneiss, schist, and granites. Precipitation runoff from this geographical feature drains to the Colorado River, approximately two miles to the northeast.

== Climate ==
According to the Köppen climate classification system, Independence Monument is located in a semi-arid climate zone. Summers are hot and dry, while winters are cold with some snow. Temperatures reach 100 °F (38 °C) on 5.3 days, 90 °F (32 °C) on 57 days, and remain at or below freezing on 13 days annually. The months April through October offer the most favorable weather to visit.

Climate data for Colorado National Monument (1981–2010 normals)
Month	Jan	Feb	Mar	Apr	May	Jun	Jul	Aug	Sep	Oct	Nov	Dec	Year
Mean daily maximum °F (°C)	38.6 (3.7)	44.1 (6.7)	54.4 (12.4)	62.9 (17.2)	74.0 (23.3)	85.8 (29.9)	92.3 (33.5)	89.1 (31.7)	79.8 (26.6)	65.4 (18.6)	49.6 (9.8)	38.7 (3.7)	64.6 (18.1)
Mean daily minimum °F (°C)	22.4 (−5.3)	26.9 (−2.8)	34.4 (1.3)	40.7 (4.8)	50.3 (10.2)	59.6 (15.3)	65.9 (18.8)	63.3 (17.4)	55.0 (12.8)	43.3 (6.3)	31.7 (−0.2)	23.3 (−4.8)	43.1 (6.2)
Average precipitation inches (mm)	0.74 (19)	0.71 (18)	1.02 (26)	1.07 (27)	1.05 (27)	0.74 (19)	0.84 (21)	1.07 (27)	1.22 (31)	1.28 (33)	0.97 (25)	0.78 (20)	11.51 (292)
Average snowfall inches (cm)	5.8 (15)	4.9 (12)	3.3 (8.4)	1.1 (2.8)	0 (0)	0 (0)	0 (0)	0 (0)	0 (0)	0.5 (1.3)	2.5 (6.4)	6.6 (17)	24.7 (62.9)
Average precipitation days (≥ 0.01 in)	5.3	5.3	6.4	5.7	5.8	4.1	6.1	7.0	6.3	6.2	5.6	5.7	69.7
Average snowy days (≥ 0.1 in)	3.9	2.9	2.3	0.6	0	0	0	0	0	0.4	1.8	4.2	16.1
Source: NOAA

== Gallery ==
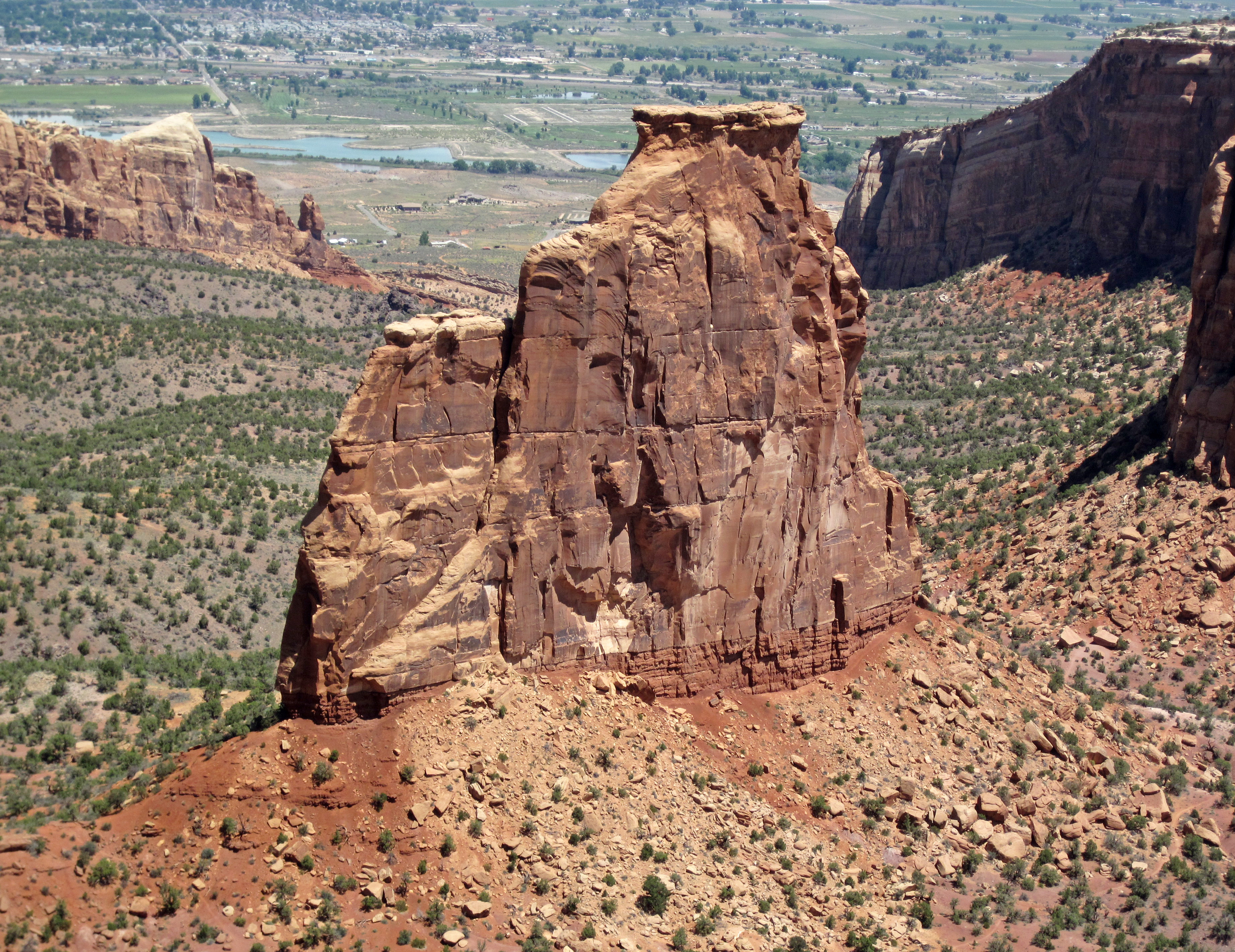

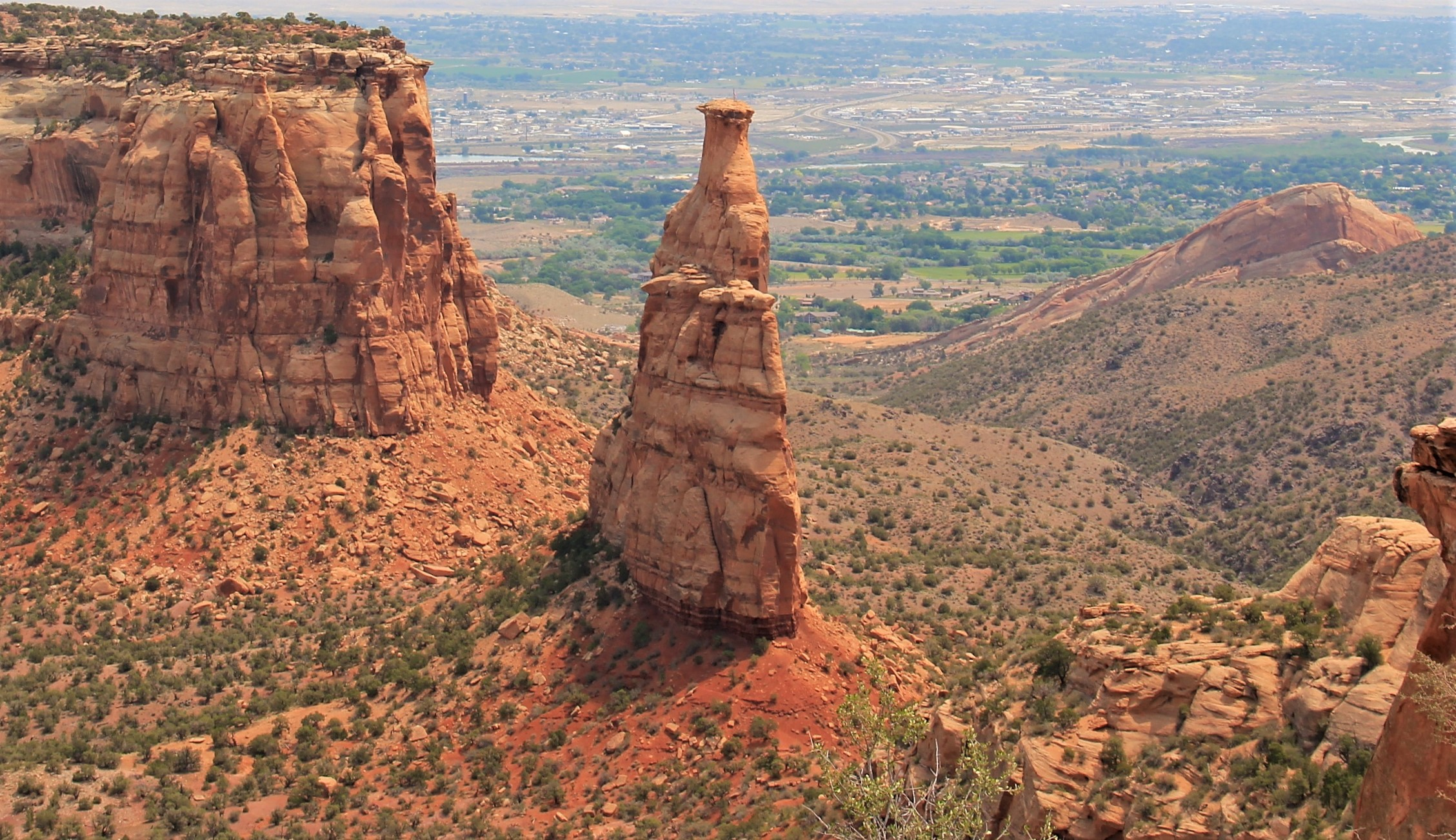

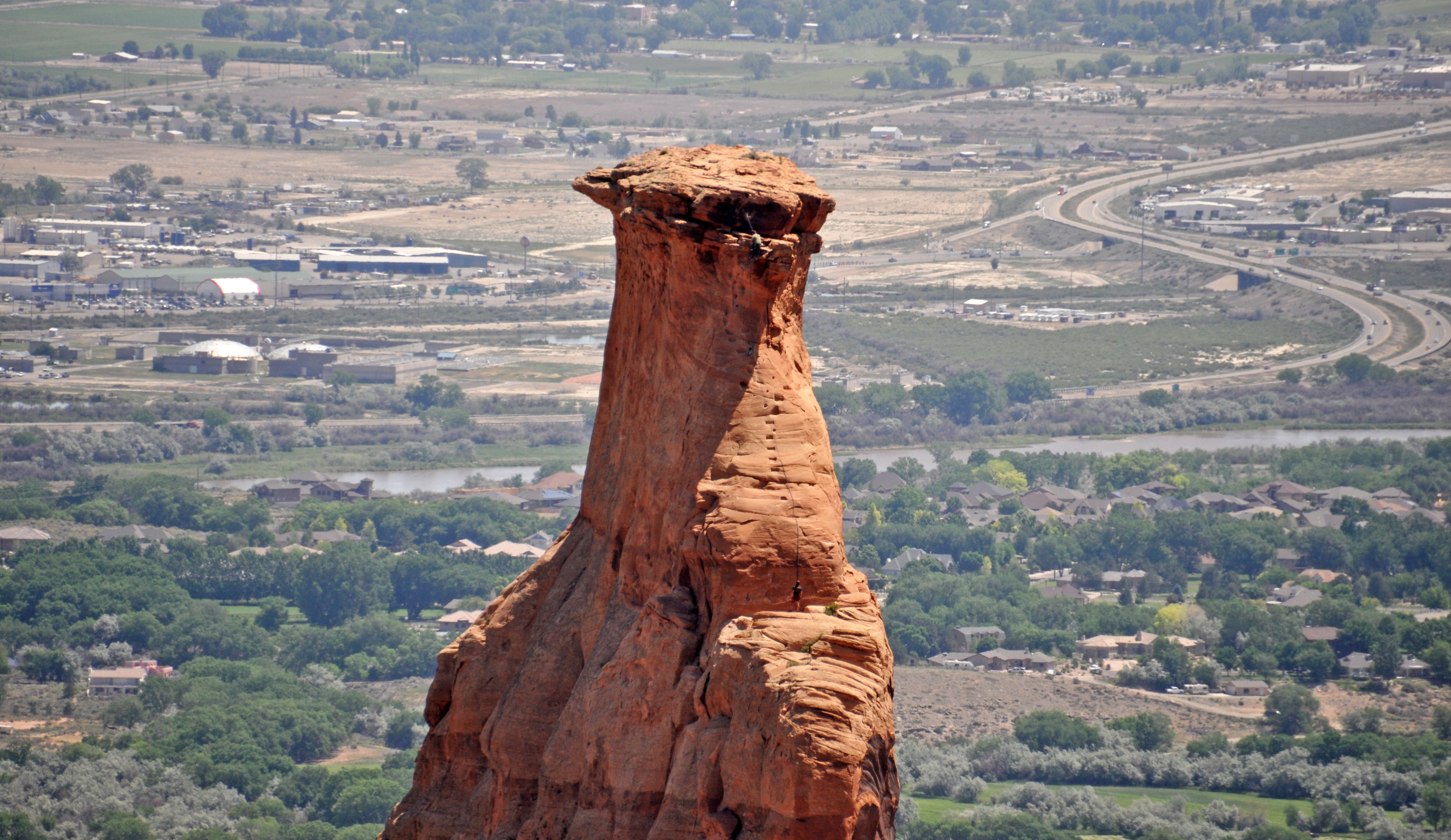
Climbers nearing the summit, Note the steps John Otto carved into the rock.

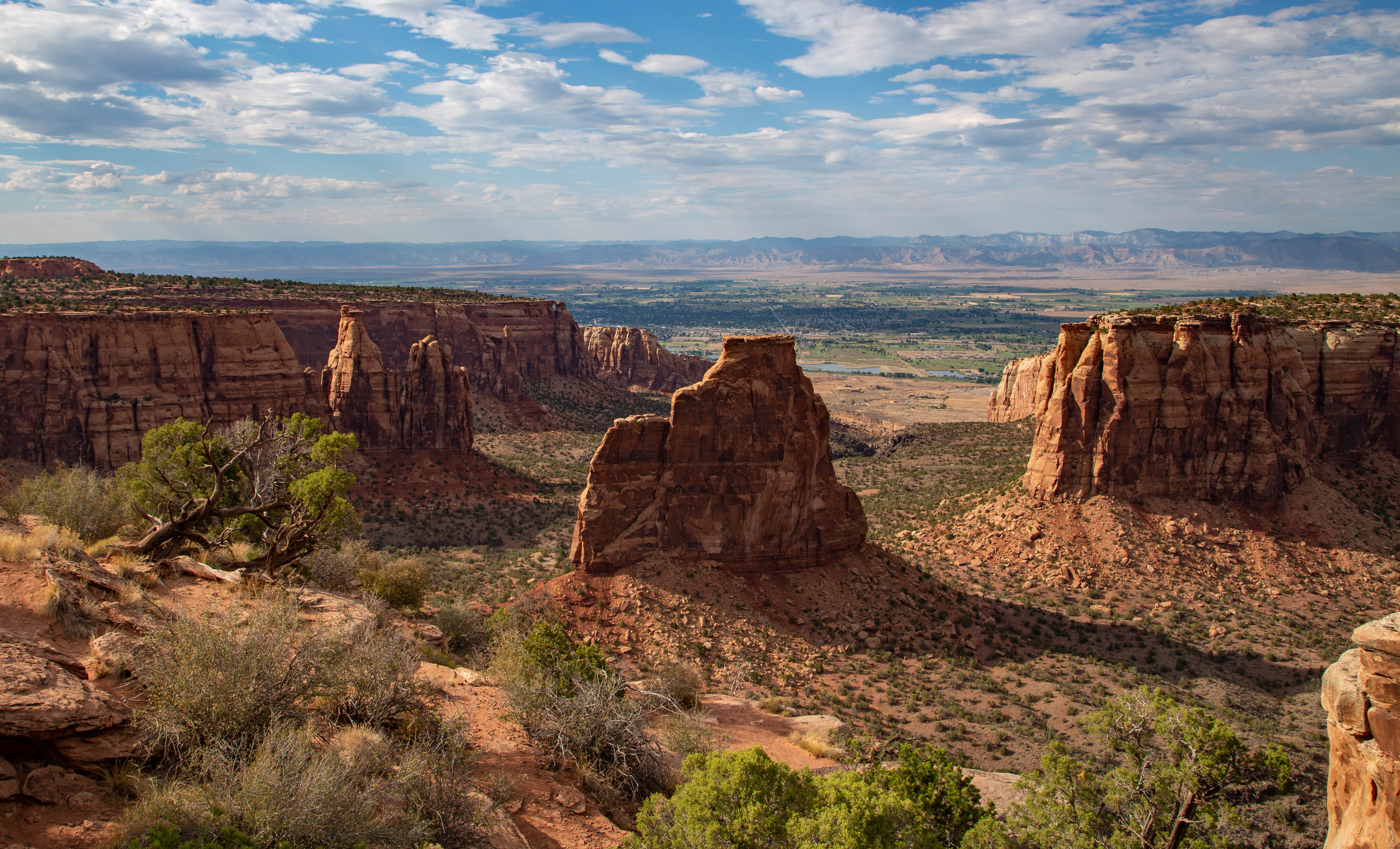

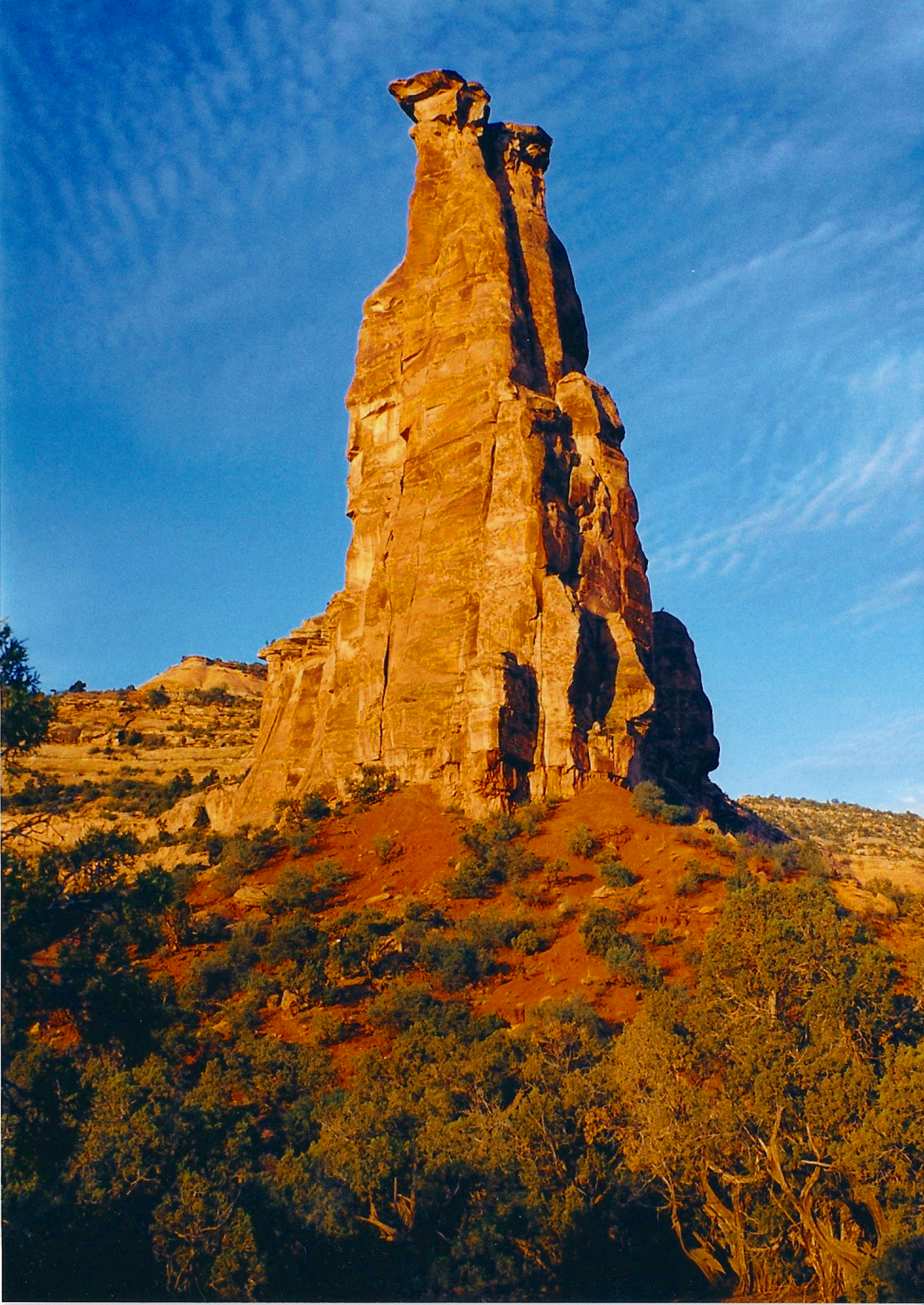

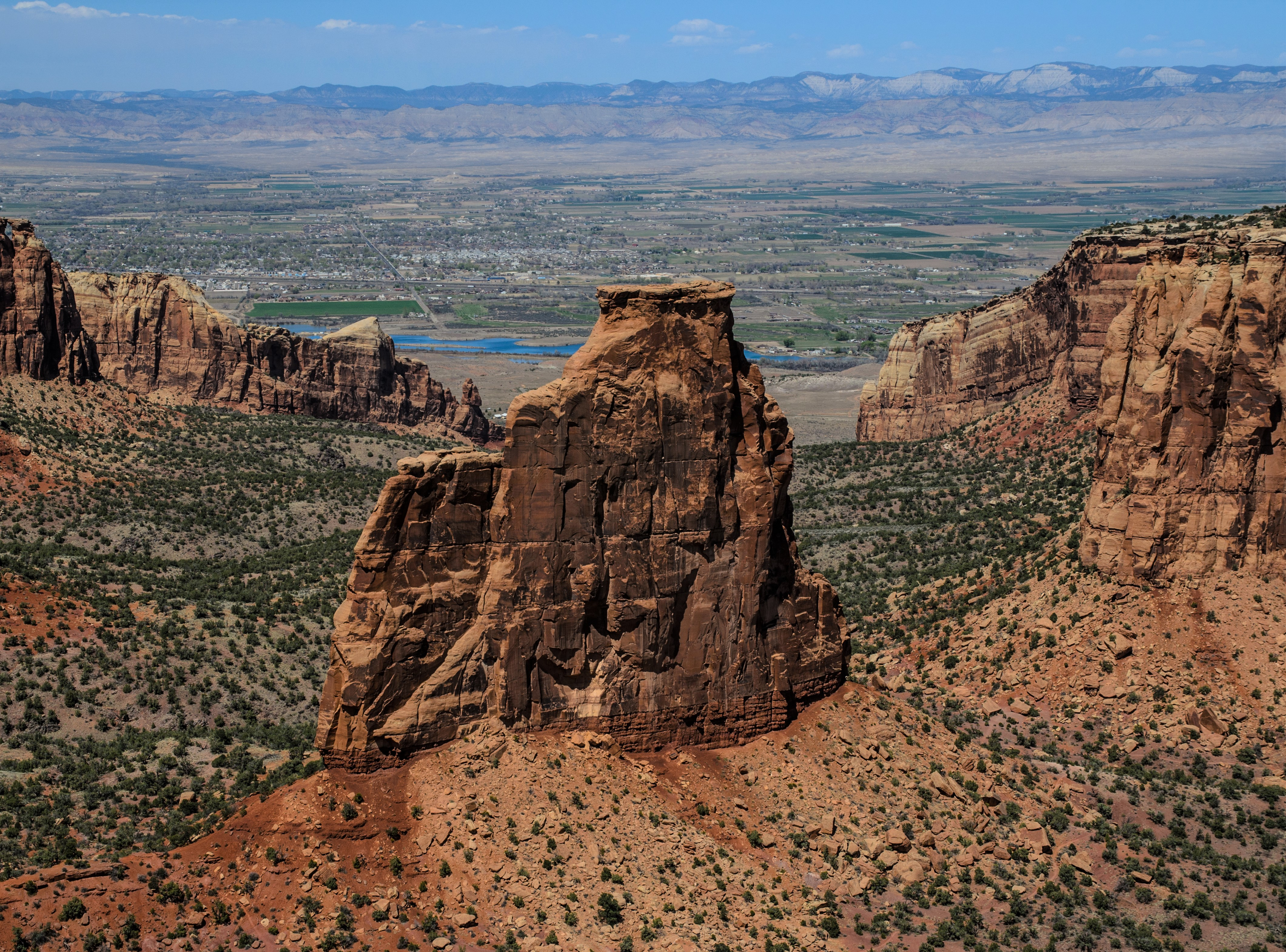

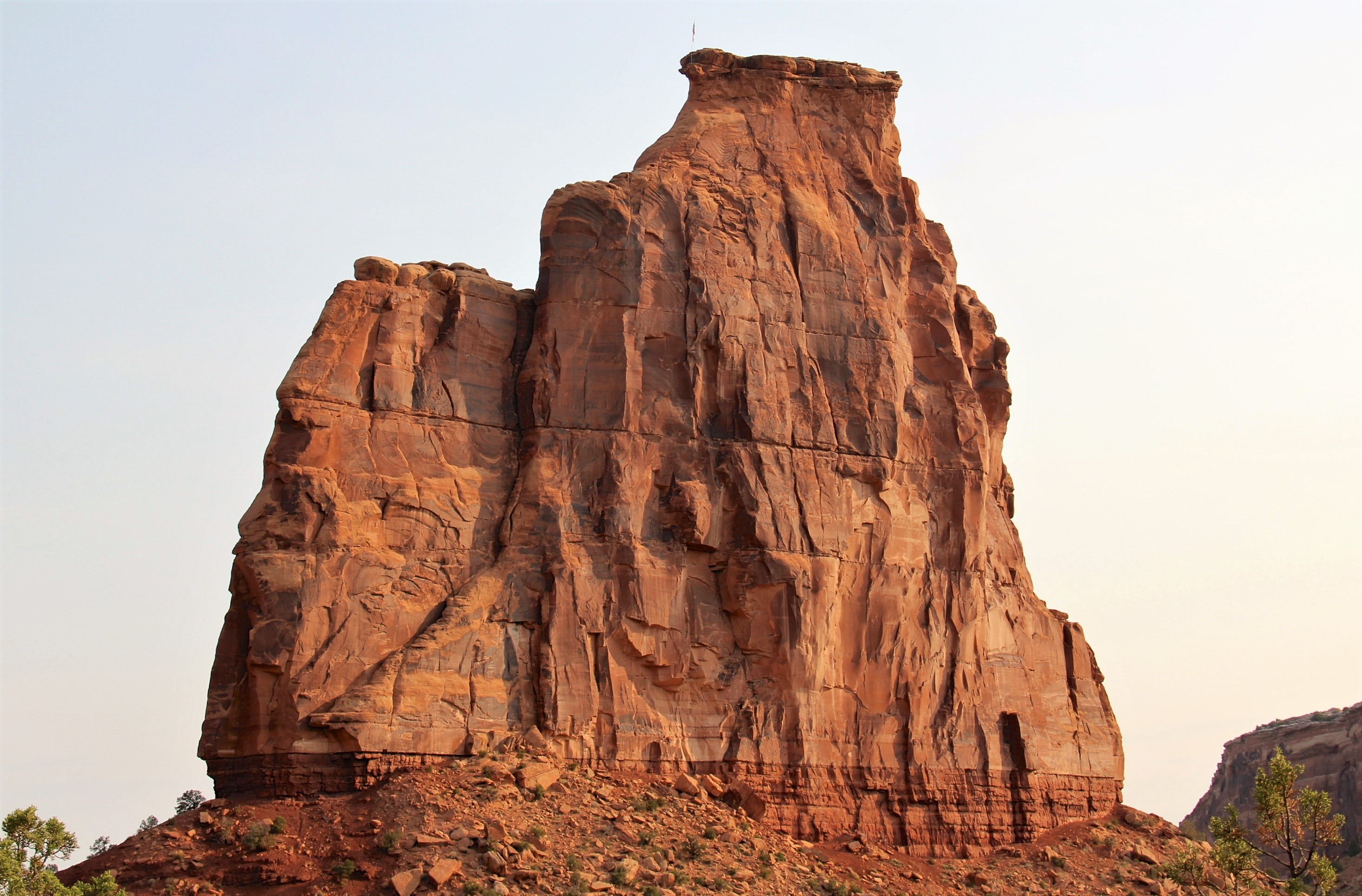

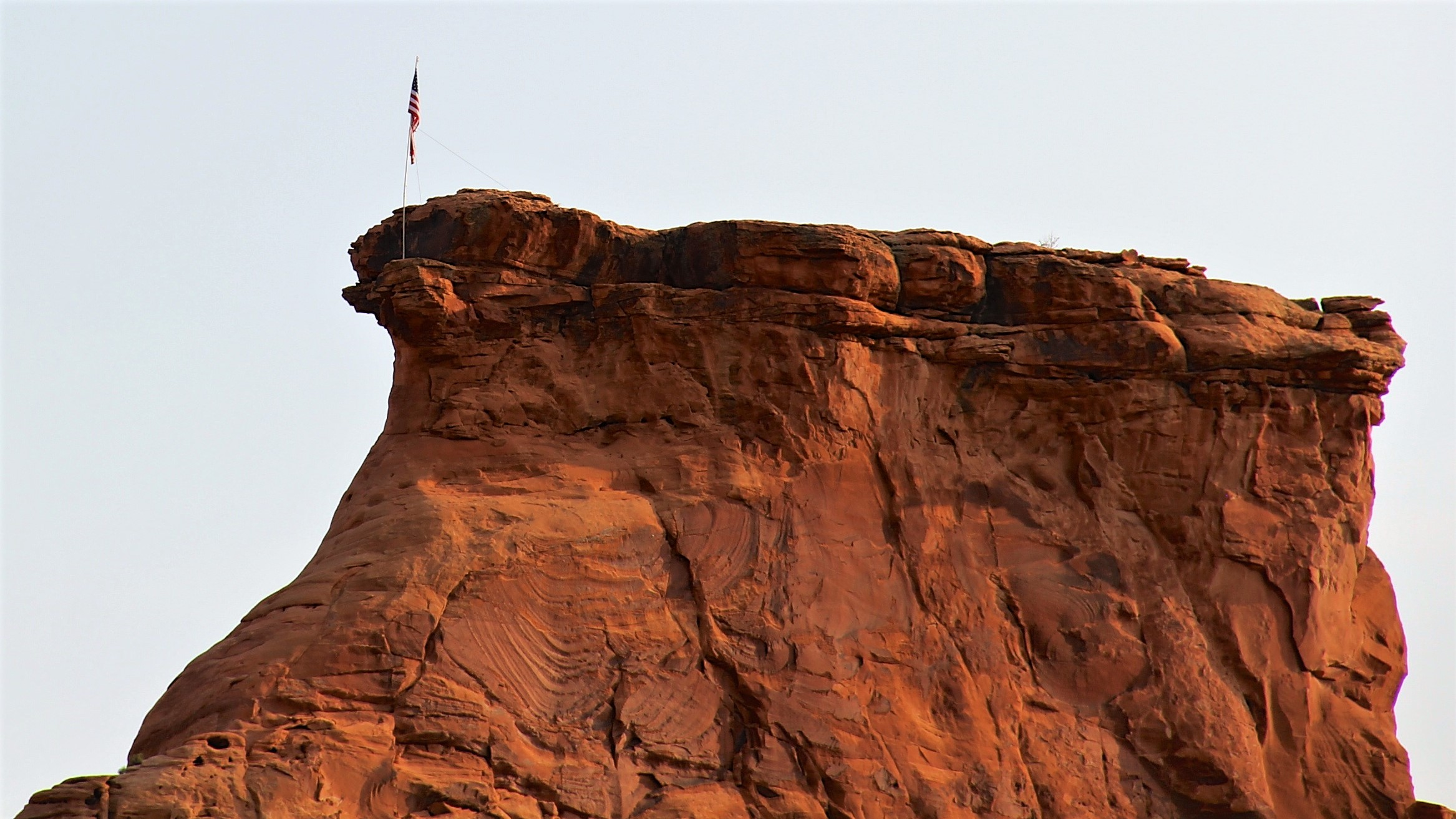

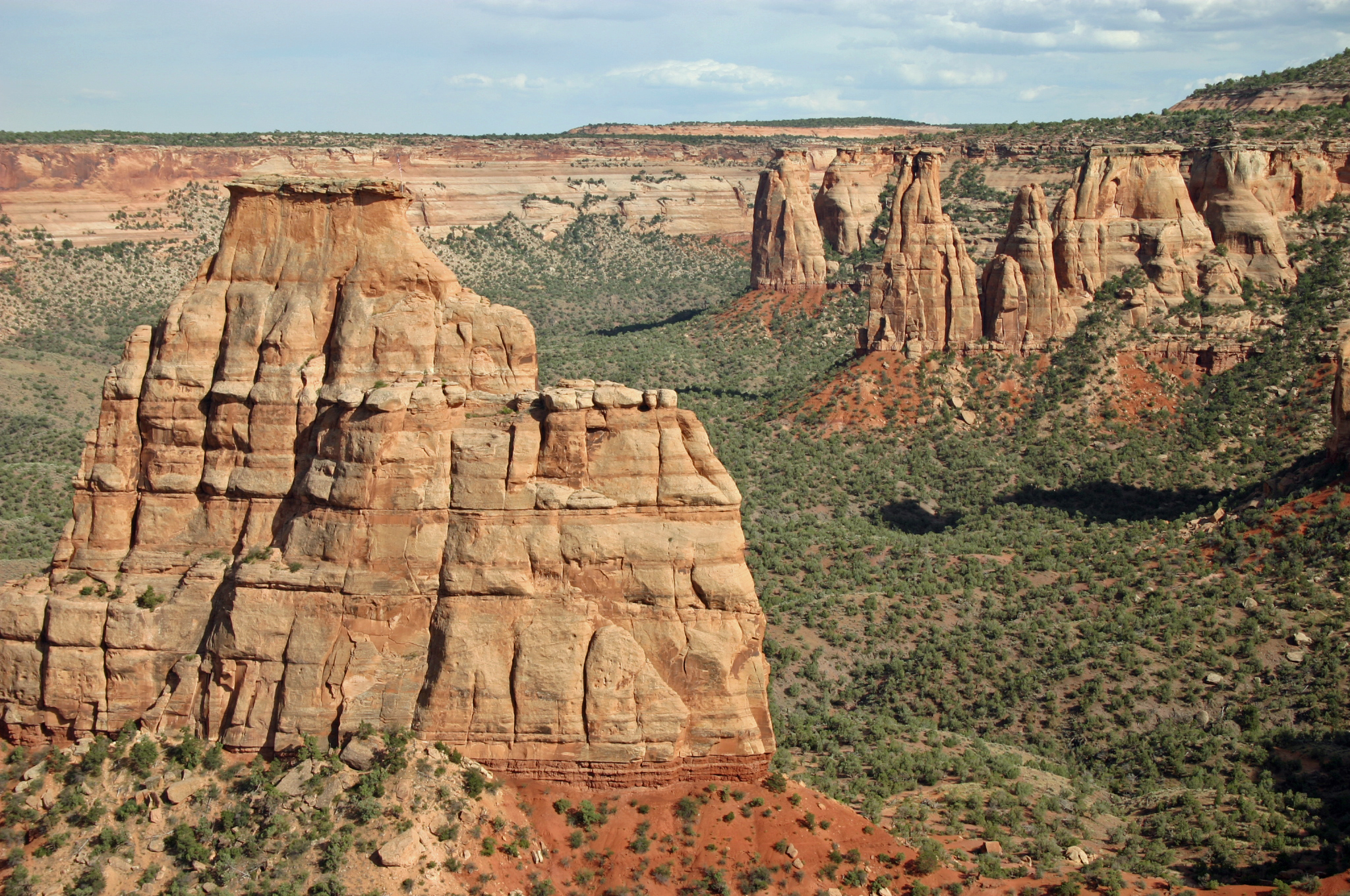
Independence Monument (left), Kissing Couple (right)

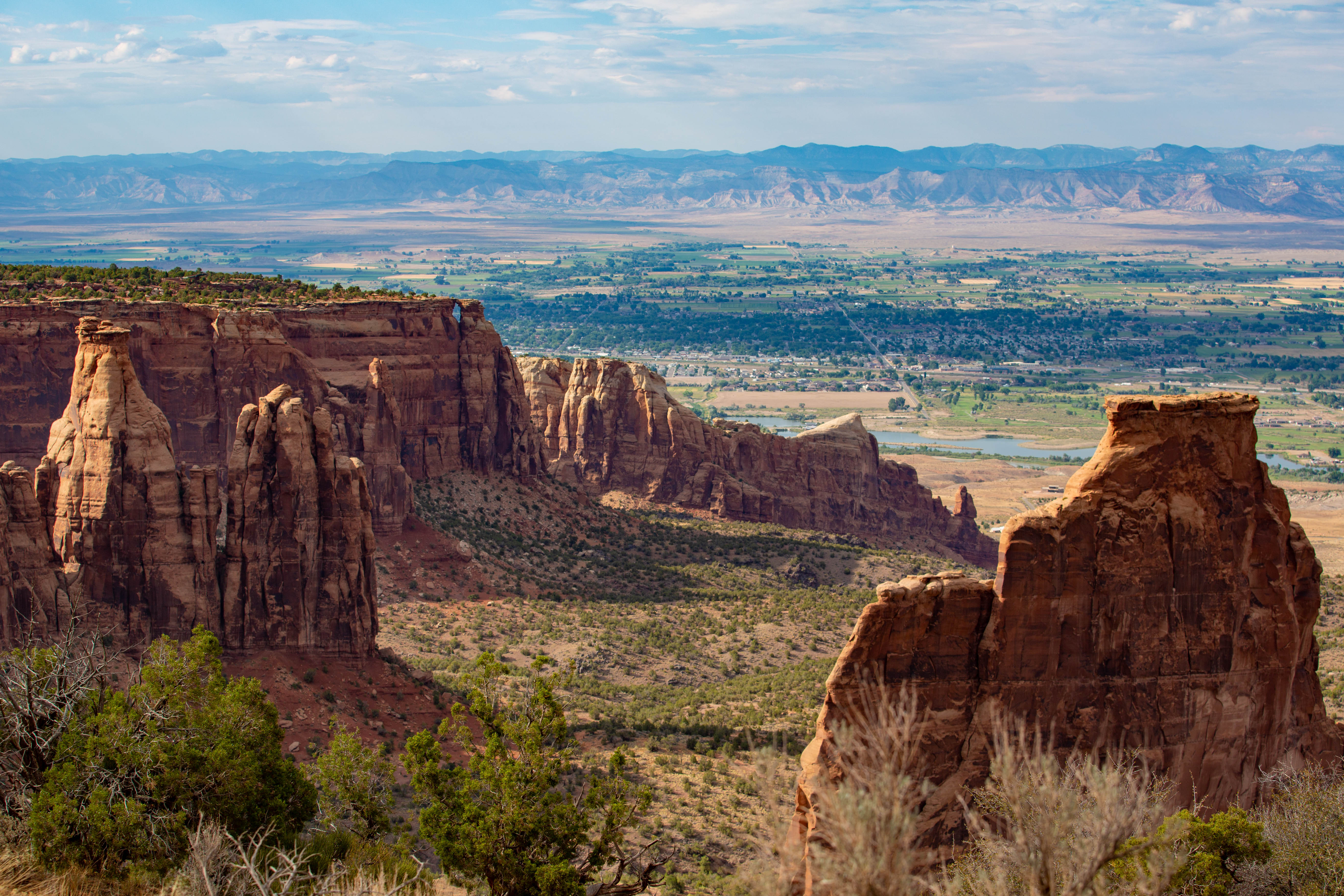
Pipe Organ (left), Independence Monument (right) from Rim Rock Drive

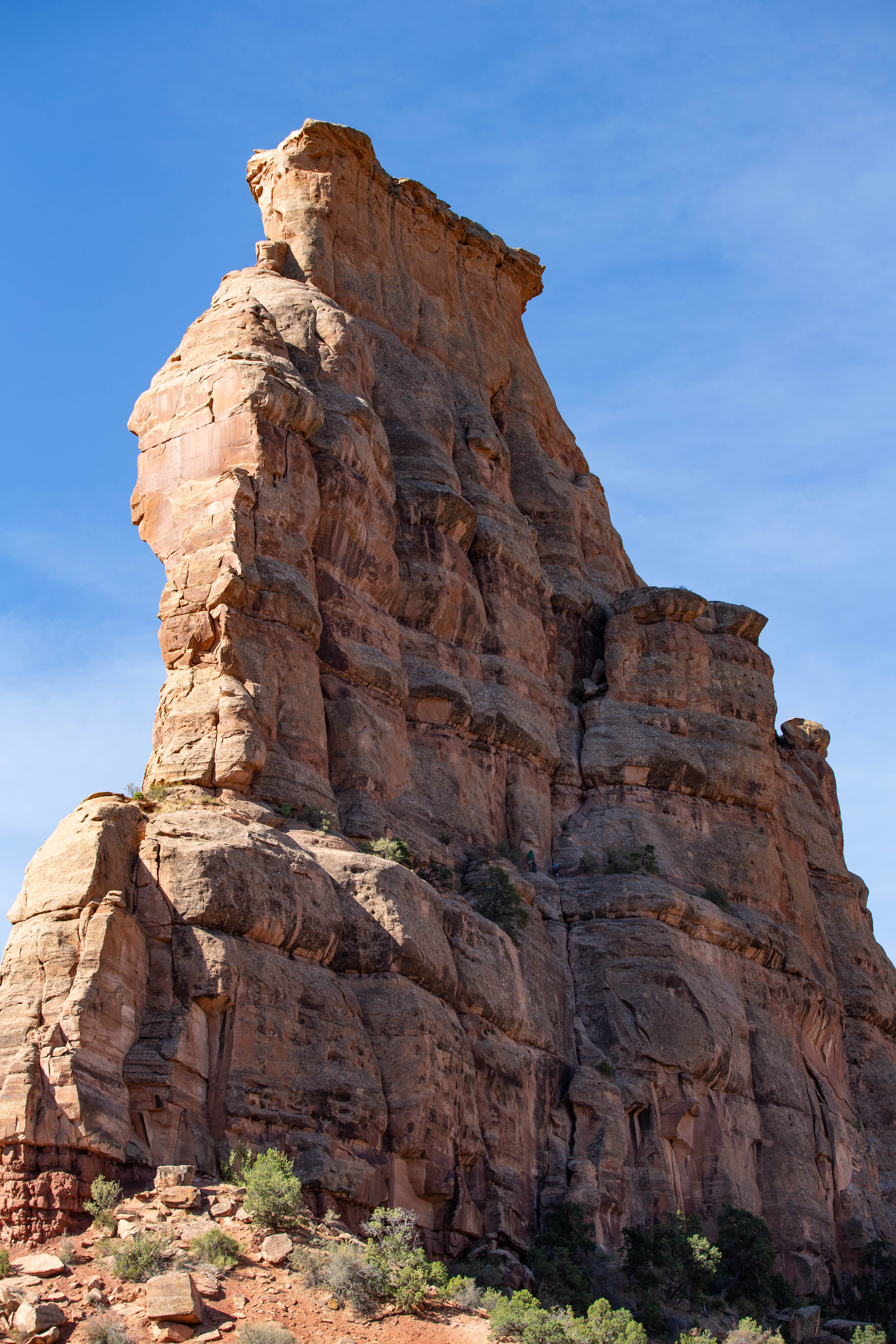
Climbers at the top of the first pitch of Otto's Route

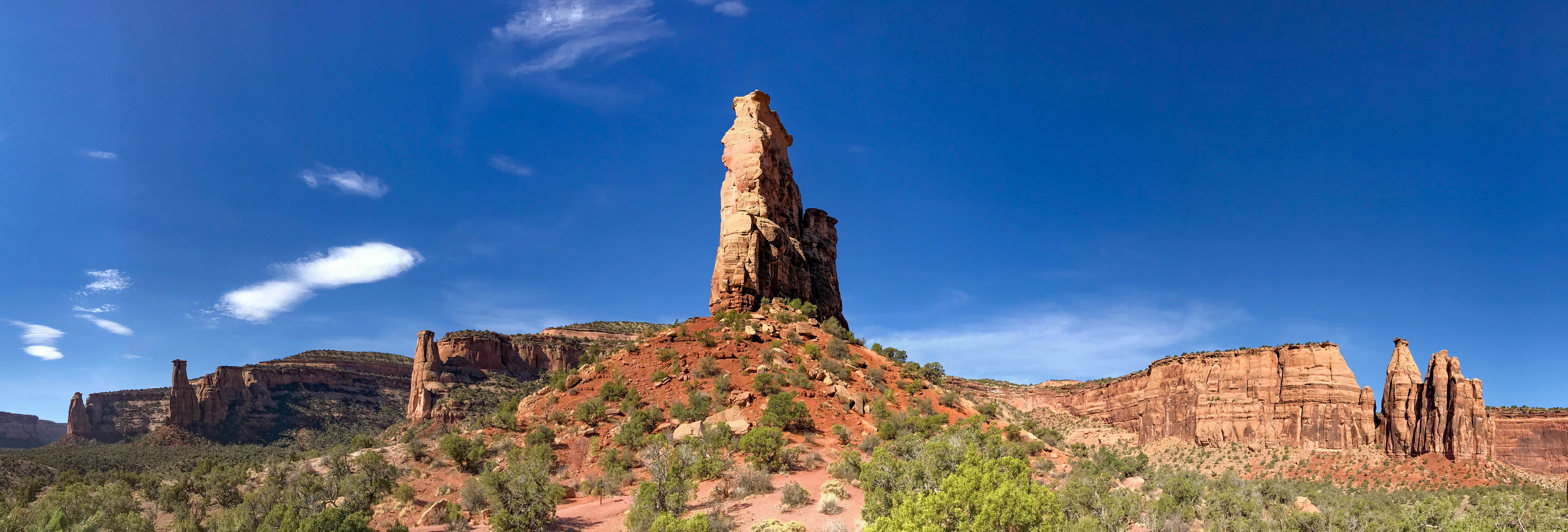
Left to rightː Egypt Rock, Kissing Couple, Grand View Spire, Independence Monument (centered), Pipe Organ (right).

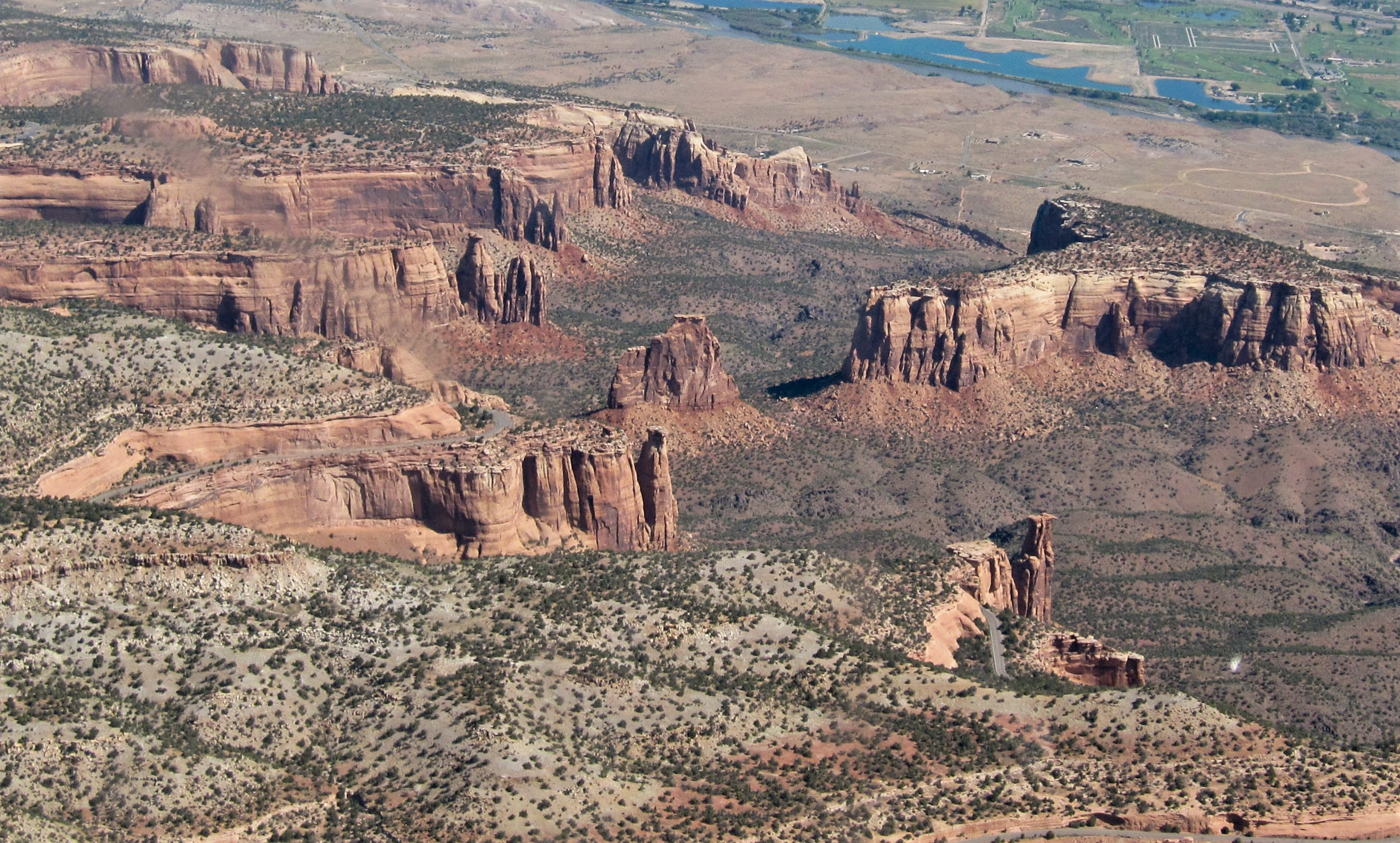
Aerial view with Independence Monument centered

== See also ==
- List of rock formations in the United States
- Kissing Couple
- Pipe Organ
- Grand View Spire
