= Beatrice Farnham =

American artist and entrepreneur (1876–1979)

Beatrice Farnham (February 5, 1876 – February 19, 1979) was a 20th-century American artist and entrepreneur who was notable for her native-American-inspired fashion and handicrafts, her impassioned defense of tribal culture in newspaper interviews, and her outdoor wedding ceremony with noted Colorado park ranger John Otto.

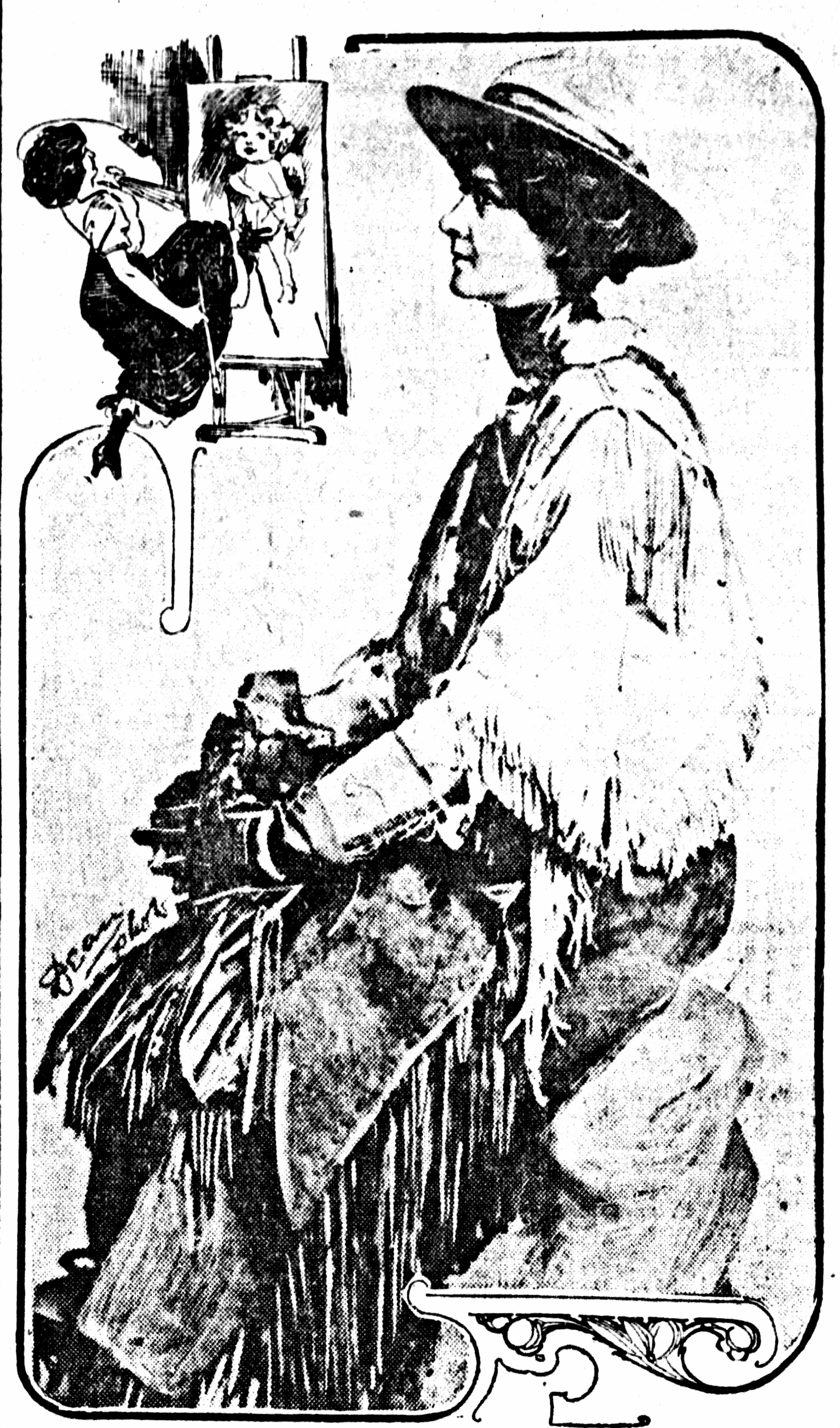
Los Angeles Times photo of Beatrice Farnham, 1912, with a sketch of her at the easel in the top left corner

== Early life ==
Beatrice was born February 5, 1876, in Jefferson, Maine. She was the daughter of Briggs C. Farnham, a farmer who was born in Maine and lived in South Weymouth, Massachusetts, and Minerva or Minnie C. Farnham. She was "brought up in a prim New England style in an ultra-conservative village" in a house that was more than a century old.

In the 1880 census, the four-year-old girl was listed as Flover B. Farnham or Flora B. Farnham.

She was graduated with high honors from the Hopkins Art Institute in San Francisco, California, with a specialty of the art of the American Indian. She went among Indian tribes to study their decorations of "pottery, leather things, cloth and basketry."

In 1904 Farnham, who had been living in Boston, purchased the Ebenezer Vinson homestead on Randolph Street, South Weymouth, and said she intended to use it as a summer home.

== Business ==
In the 1910s she was living at 116 Randolph in Weymouth, Massachusetts. Her occupation was given as "designer." Farnham spent three months a year "among the Indians of various tribes, gathering ideas for her work," and for six months she made articles "required by the chain of stores she supplies." She made "Indian novelties, such as curtains, cushions, baskets and indoor decorations." She traveled for three months to various cities in search of business and taking orders.

In September 1910, Sarah Comstock interviewed Farnham for Collier's magazine, for an article on women farmers. Farnham told the writer that:

I had a studio, and I worked, worked, worked, until I began to feel the pressure — it got heavier and heavier, and I saw what might happen. So I set to work among the chickens. It's wonderful, the lullaby to nerves that lies in their clucks and cheeps. ... But my designing is my real work.

== Interests ==
=== Native American culture ===
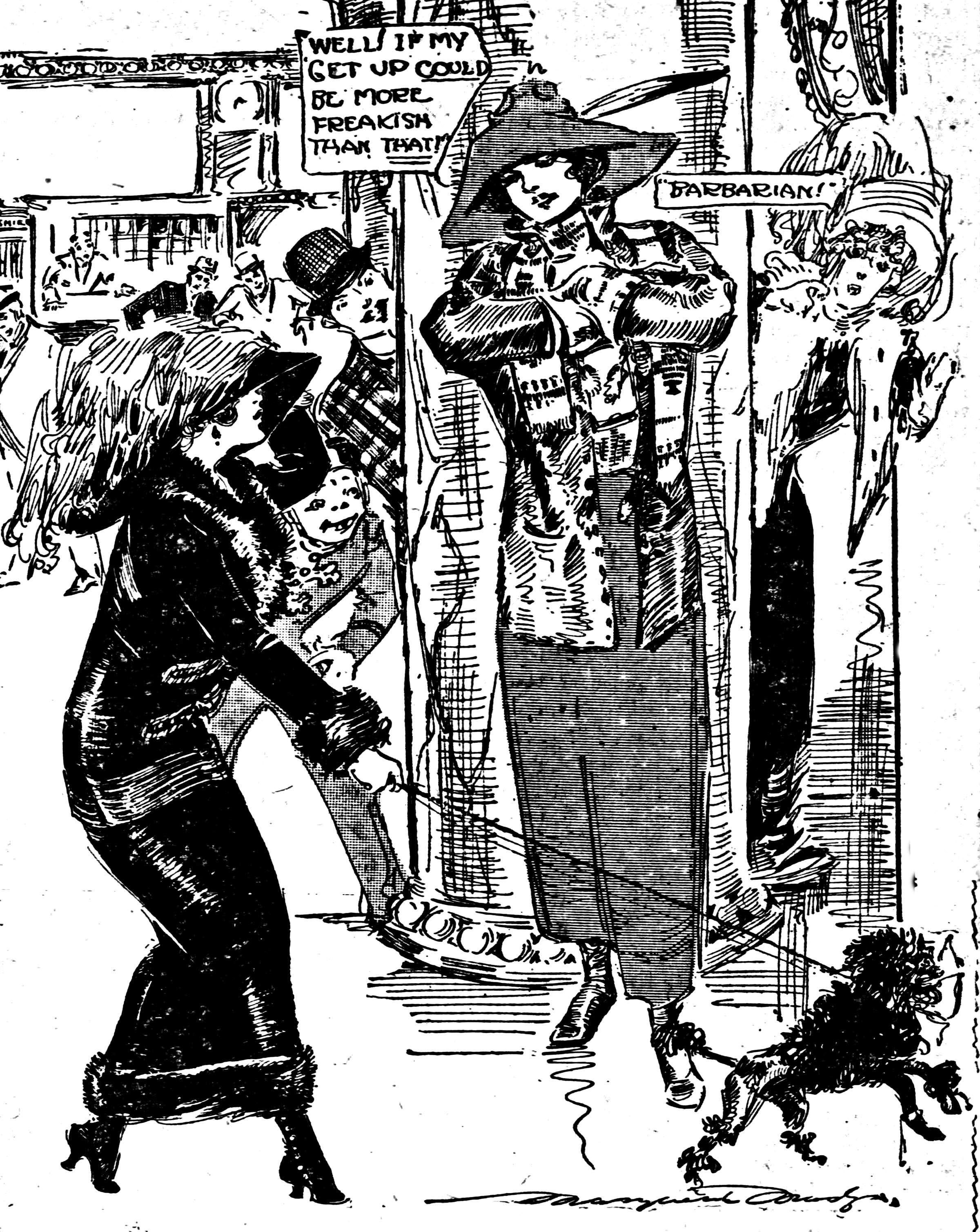
1911 sketch by Marguerite Martyn of the St. Louis Post-Dispatch contrasts Farnham's attire and attitude with that of another woman in a hotel lobby as observers stare.

In 1911, two major newspapers reported Farnham's interest in Native American culture. "The more I see of this boasted civilization, the more I like – Indians," she told Marguerite Martyn of the St. Louis Post-Dispatch. She added:

Civilization! Why the Navajos have a civilization that is older and more tried and true than this. It makes ours look pallid and sickly. Culture? I know old Indians who are more cultured in the real sense of the word than your so-called polished men of the East. All Indians have an inborn sense of courtesy and hospitality toward strangers that would forbid such manners as cultivated strangers have shown me here this morning.

The Indians, she told Gertrude Gordon of the Pittsburgh Press, are "true, honest people, in the main, and the men are absolutely trustworthy, which is more than I can say of some of our white men."

=== Other ===
The May 28, 1910, issue of Collier's noted that Farnham "is investigating our great river highways by means of her own motorboat. She runs the Aloha herself, has covered hundreds of miles on the Ohio and its tributaries, and contemplates going down the Mississippi [River] on her next outing."

In August 1910, Farnham placed a classified advertisement in the Cincinnati Enquirer to sell a "new motor boat, fully equipped for cruising, size 32x8-1/2 feet; heavy duty engine; cost $1,800; ... at big sacrifice if at once; stored at Havana, Ill. Adress [sic] Miss Beatrice Farnham, South Weymouth, Mass."

A newspaper report in 1911 said that Farnham found South Weymouth "deadly dull and [nearby] Boston far too prim. What's more, she was given to shocking folks with her frank, outspoken opinions on men, women and things."

After her wedding to John Otto in 1911 (below), she publicized her interest in setting up an "Independence Colony" near Grand Junction, Colorado, where "girls of high society and the daughters of working men will be brought together to be taught new ideals of a sane American life."

We will discard corsets, and rats, and puffs, and powder and give the girls the real complexion. Tan is a good asset for anyone, man or woman. . . . Cigarettes and cocktails will be tabooed.

== Physical appearance ==
In 1911, at age 35, Farnham was "fully six feet tall, athletic, wiry and bubbling over with high spirits." She had a "lithe figure and sun-tanned features" with "snappy eyes and wholesome ways."

She dressed as her whim dictated. Whenever she came to a settlement, folks saw that she wore a costume half Indian, half cowgirl. Her skirt, made of leather as soft as silk, was of the divided pattern, fringed and beaded, and deftly decorated with insertions of bright yellow leather. . . . Her hat was always a sombrero, sometimes with a burnt leather band and sometimes with beads.

Another writer in the same year noted that Farnham was a "very tall, slender girl, carrying a leather saddlebag rolled and strapped into a package easily handled. On her head she wore a Western sombrero, wide of brim and wound with a leather strap. Another strap passed under the coils of her tightly braided hair," and she used no hatpin. She carried a "beautifully dyed" quirt made of horsehair, which, she said, was "weighted with buckshot and would fell a man if wielded by a strong hand."

== Marriages ==
=== To John Otto ===
Farnham and John Otto met in 1910 at a camp in the desert about fifty miles from Albuquerque, New Mexico. She returned a year later with three friends, where she renewed her friendship with Otto. They became engaged, and, instead of a ring, he gave her a burro named Foxy.

She wanted to be married on top of Independence Rock, Colorado, now called Colorado National Monument, but Otto declined because he didn't believe he could find any clergyman who could make the dangerous climb. Instead, the two agreed to be married at the foot of Temple Rock.

They were wed June 20, 1911, at the base of Independence Monument "on a narrow ledge a hundred feet from the ground" and reached by a trail sawn out of the solid rock by the bridegroom." She wore a wedding dress of white satin with a veil, the same one worn by her mother and grandmother. (Another source says the gown was her mother's and the veil and scarf were her grandmother's.) After a wedding dinner over a campfire, prepared by the bride, they changed their clothes, and the couple climbed Independence Rock, where they repeated vows "of their own devising."

Another report stated:

Although newspapers in other regions later reported the wedding had occurred "550 Feet in the Air, on Top of Independence Rock," the wedding actually took place near the base of Independence Monument. But, after the ceremony, Otto and his friend, Whipple Chester, climbed to the top of the spire.

Chester, the best man at the wedding, recalled that the wedding site was "about 300 feet from the base of Independence Mountain," where Otto had built an altar

about five feet in diameter, a circle made with white bits of quartz rock, flint, etc. . . . Room for just the two of them to stand in, facing north, towards the valley and the river. Arrows pointed to the four directions, and inside were the words – "Truth," "Love," "Faith," "Honor." They stood on a soft carpet of cedar boughs . . .

The marriage ended two months after it began, when Farnham "went back to her home near Boston, purportedly to collect some belongings and settle affairs" but did not return.

Mrs. Otto (Farnham) wrote to Chester that "I tried hard to live his way, but I could not do it. I could not live with a man to whom even a cabin was an encumbrance. He wanted to live in tents or without tents, outdoors."

They agreed to separate for five years and decide on their future later. They were divorced in February 1914, and Farnham paid $2,000 in alimony to Otto.

=== To Dallas Benson ===
Farnham was married in April 1915 to Dallas Benson, a Kansas cowboy and ranch foreman, whom she had met on a train. Afterward, the couple was known for an equestrian trick called "Chasing the Bride" in which she leapt from her horse into his arms as they were riding side by side. It is not known when, or if, the two were divorced.

== Later life and death ==
In 1920, Farnham and her mother were living on F Street in Washington, D.C., and she gave her occupation as bookkeeper for the government

By 1930, the two had moved to Meadows of Dan, Patrick County, Virginia, where Farnham became known as "Miss Bea." She built a private chapel on her property along the Dan River and painted a fresco on its walls. She was called a "renowned church artist and patron of Patrick County youth. She was an honorary member of the first order of St. Francis."

She journeyed to Israel via El Al in 1958.

Farnham died at the age of 103 on February 19, 1979, at Memorial Hospital in Stuart, Virginia. Burial was at Mountain View Methodist Church cemetery in Meadows of Dan.

== Tributes ==
In 1991 and 1992, forest ranger Lisa Eckert portrayed Beatrice Farnham in campfire presentations for visitors to the Colorado National Monument and to the Museum of Western Colorado.
