= Colorado National Monument Visitor Center Complex =

- U.S. National Register of Historic Places
- U.S. Historic district
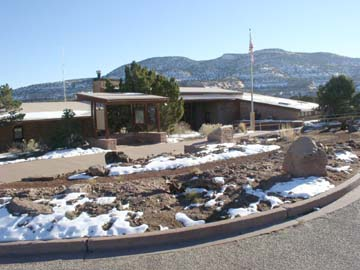
- Visitors Center, December 2003

- Location within Colorado Location within the United States
- Nearest city: Fruita, Colorado
- Coordinates: 39°6′7″N 108°43′50″W
- Built: 1963
- Architect: Doty, Cecil; Romigh, Phil
- Architectural style: Modern Movement
- NRHP reference No.: 03000647
- Added to NRHP: July 15, 2003

The Colorado National Monument Visitor Center Complex is a group of structures in Colorado National Monument in Mesa County, Colorado, United States, that is listed on the National Register of Historic Places.

== Description ==
The structures are an example of the park services facilities designed and built as part of the Mission 66 program. The complex includes the visitor center, designed by National Park Service architect Cecil J. Doty, the Bookcliff Shelter, designed by NPS architect Phil Romigh, and the Canyon Rim Trail, designed by NPS landscape architects Babbitt Hughes, and built between 1963 and 1965. The structures follow the precedent set by earlier park structures by using native sandstone laid in a random ashlar pattern.

== See also ==
- National Register of Historic Places listings in Mesa County, Colorado
