= Balanced Rock =

Rock formation in Arches National Park

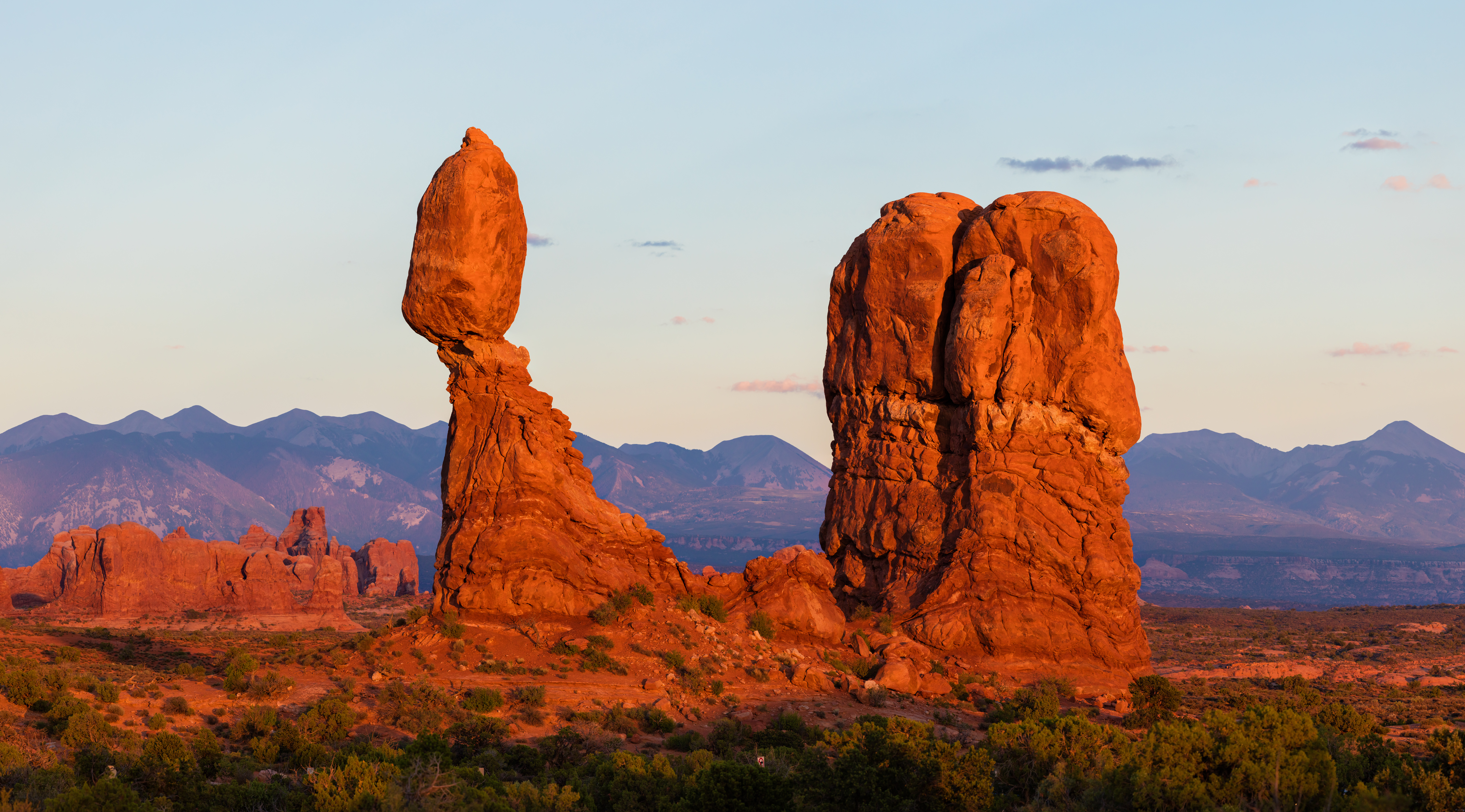
- View of Balanced Rock

- Location within Utah
- Location: Arches National Park, Utah, United States
- Nearest city: Moab
- Coordinates: 38.7013°N 109.5645°W
- Elevation: 128 ft (39 m)
- Governing body: National Park Service

Balanced Rock is one of the most popular features of Arches National Park, situated in Grand County, Utah, United States. Balanced Rock is located next to the park's main road, at about 9.2 miles (14.8 km) from the park entrance. It is one of only a few prominent features clearly visible from the road. The total height of Balanced Rock is 128 feet (39 m), with the balancing rock rising 55 feet (16.75 m) above the base. This rock is the largest of its kind in the park, weighing approximately 3,577 tons.

== Geology ==
Balanced Rock is composed of the hard Slick Rock Member of the Entrada Sandstone formation. It sits on a pedestal of the softer Dewey Bridge Member, which erodes at a faster rate. As a result, it will eventually collapse. Balanced Rock had a smaller sibling named "Chip Off the Old Block" that collapsed in the winter of 1975–76 as a result of the same forces.

== Access ==
The formation can be accessed by a 1/4 mile (400 meter) paved loop trail from the main road leading to the base of the formation.

== In popular culture ==
Balanced Rock can be seen in the opening of the 1989 film Indiana Jones and the Last Crusade.

== See also ==
- Balanced Rock (Garden of the Gods)
- Balancing rock
