= Arches National Park =

National park in Utah, United States

- IUCN category II (national park)
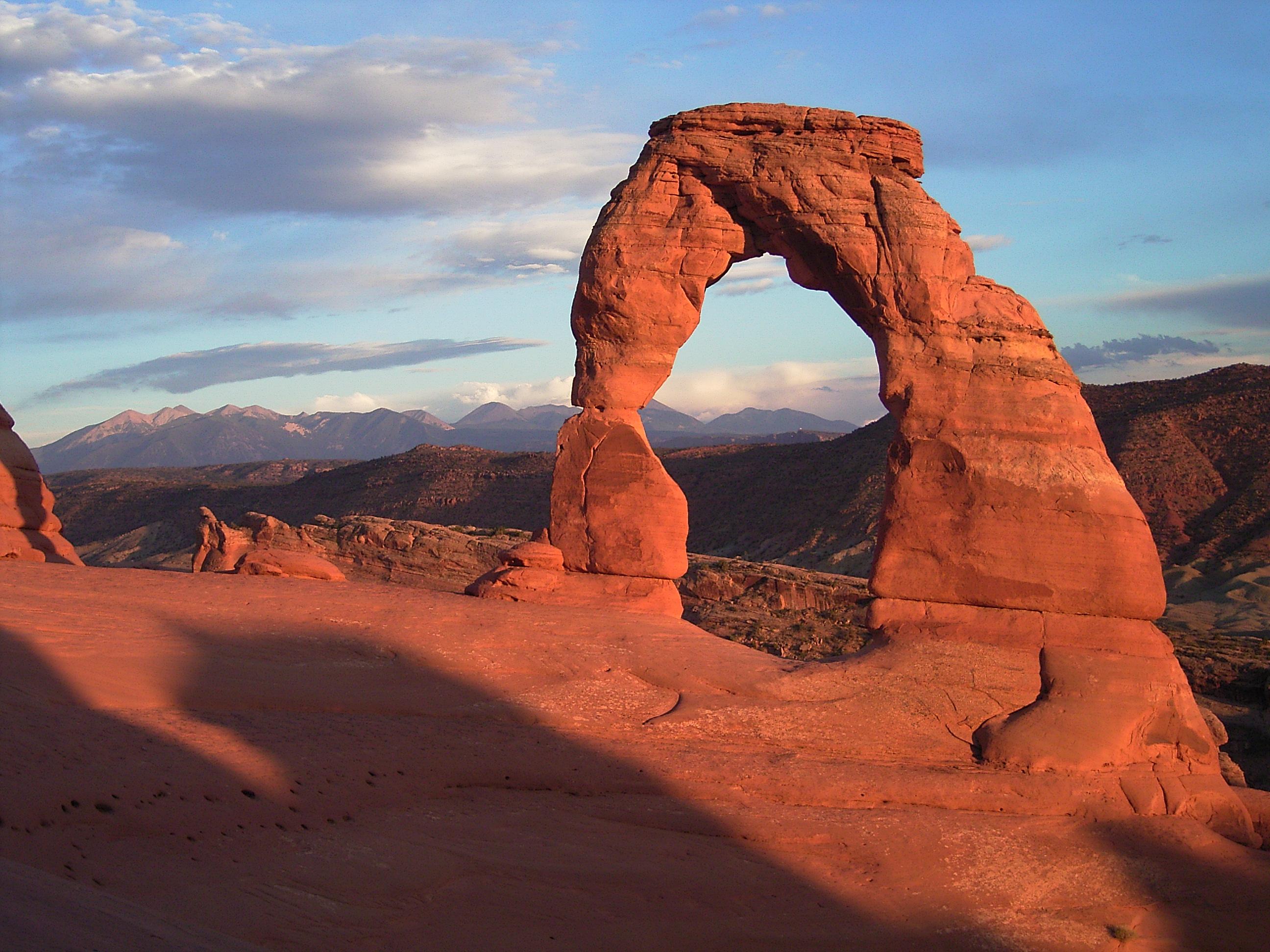
- Delicate Arch with background of La Sal Mountains
- Interactive map of Arches National Park
- Location: Grand County, Utah, US
- Nearest city: Moab, Utah
- Coordinates: 38°43′41″N 109°32′24″W
- Area: 76,679 acres (119.811 sq mi; 31,031 ha; 310.31 km^{2})
- Established: April 12, 1929; 97 years ago, as a national monument; November 12, 1971; 55 years ago, as a national park
- Visitors: 1,511,740 (in 2025)
- Governing body: National Park Service
- Website: nps.gov/arch

Arches National Park is a national park of the United States in eastern Utah. The park is adjacent to the Colorado River, 4 mi (6 km) north of Moab, Utah. The park contains more than 2,000 natural sandstone arches, including the well-known Delicate Arch, which constitute the highest density of natural arches in the world. It also contains a variety of other unique geological resources and formations. The national park lies above an underground evaporite layer or salt bed, which is the main cause of the formation of the arches, spires, balanced rocks, sandstone fins, and eroded monoliths in the area.

The park consists of 310.31 km^{2} (76,680 acres; 119.81 sq mi) of high desert located on the Colorado Plateau. The highest elevation in the park is 5,653 ft (1,723 m) at Elephant Butte, and the lowest elevation is 4,085 ft (1,245 m) at the visitor center. The park receives an average of less than 10 in (250 mm) of rain annually.

Administered by the National Park Service, the area was originally designated a national monument on April 12, 1929, before being redesignated a national park on November 12, 1971. The park recorded 1,511,740 recreation visits in 2025, compared with 1,806,865 in 2021.

== Park purpose ==
As stated in the foundation document in U.S. National Park Service website:

The purpose of Arches National Park is to protect extraordinary examples of geologic features including arches, natural bridges, windows, spires, and balanced rocks, as well as other features of geologic, historic, and scientific interest, and to provide opportunities to experience these resources and their associated values in their majestic natural settings.

== Geology ==
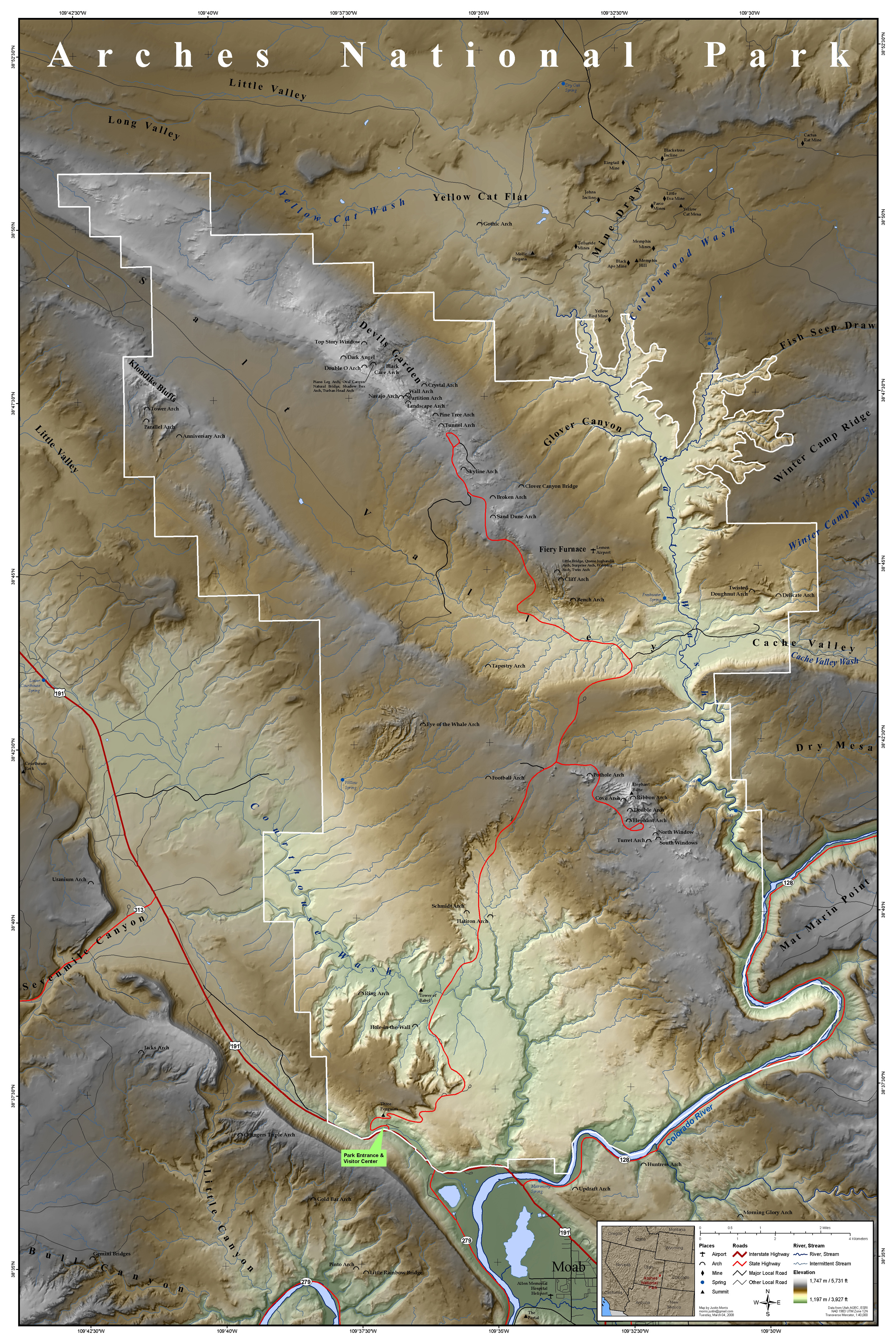
Map of Arches National Park

The national park lies above an underground evaporite layer or salt bed, which is the main cause of the formation of the arches, spires, balanced rocks, sandstone fins, and eroded monoliths in the area. This salt bed is thousands of feet thick in places and was deposited in the Paradox Basin of the Colorado Plateau some 300 million years ago (Mya) when a sea flowed into the region and eventually evaporated. Over millions of years, the salt bed was covered with debris eroded from the Uncompahgre Uplift to the northeast. During the Early Jurassic (about 200 Mya), desert conditions prevailed in the region and the vast Navajo Sandstone was deposited. An additional sequence of stream laid and windblown sediments, the Entrada Sandstone (about 140 Mya), was deposited on top of the Navajo. Over 5,000 feet (1,500 m) of younger sediments were deposited and have been mostly eroded. Remnants of the cover exist in the area including exposures of the Cretaceous Mancos Shale. The arches of the area are developed mostly within the Entrada formation.

The weight of this cover caused the salt bed below it to liquefy and thrust up layers of rock into salt domes. The evaporites of the area formed more unusual "salt anticlines" or linear regions of uplift. Faulting occurred and whole sections of rock subsided into the areas between the domes. In places these blocks were tilted until their rock layers stood almost vertical. The result of one such 2,500 ft (760 m) displacement, the Moab Fault, is seen from the visitor center.

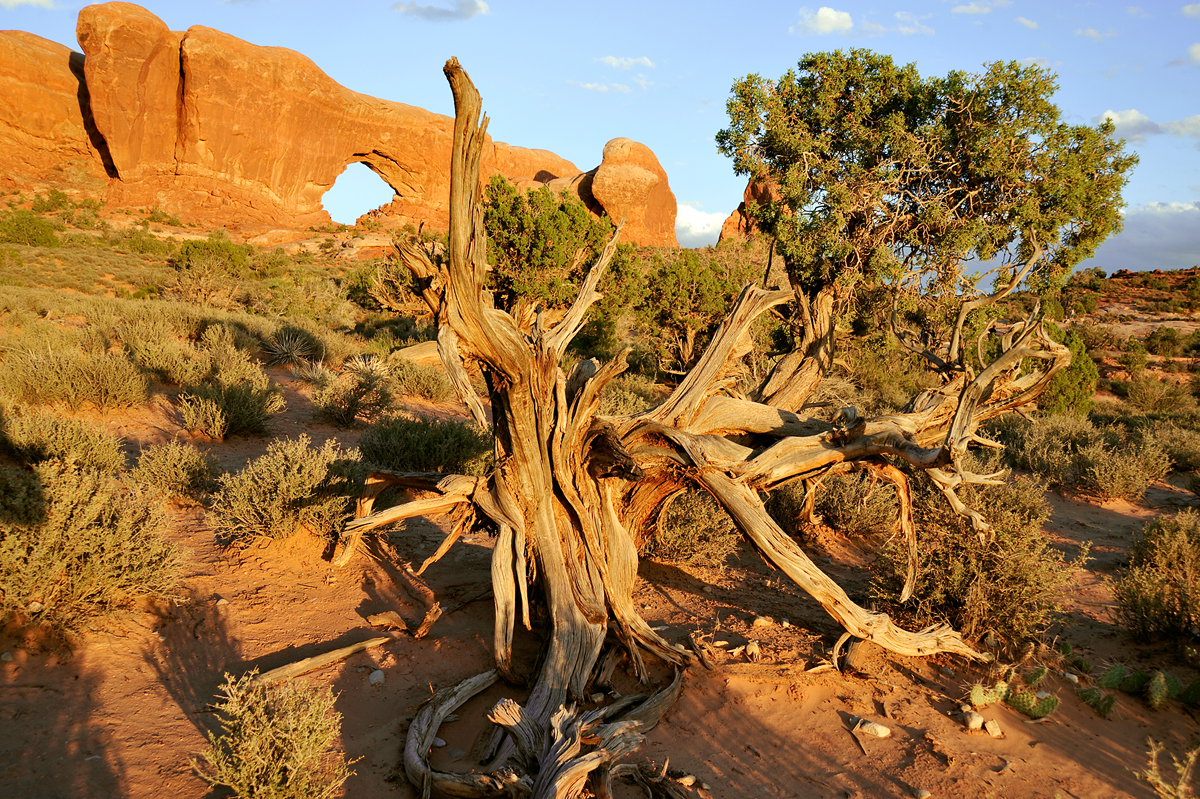
North Window

As this subsurface movement of salt shaped the landscape, erosion removed the younger rock layers from the surface. Except for isolated remnants, the major formations visible in the park today are the salmon-colored Entrada Sandstone, in which most of the arches form, and the buff-colored Navajo Sandstone. These are visible in layer-cake fashion throughout most of the park. Over time, water seeped into the surface cracks, joints, and folds of these layers. Ice formed in the fissures, expanding and putting pressure on surrounding rock, breaking off bits and pieces. Winds later cleaned out the loose particles. A series of free-standing fins remained. Wind and water attacked these fins until, in some, the cementing material gave way and chunks of rock tumbled out. Many damaged fins collapsed. Others, with the right degree of hardness and balance, survived despite their missing sections. These became the famous arches.

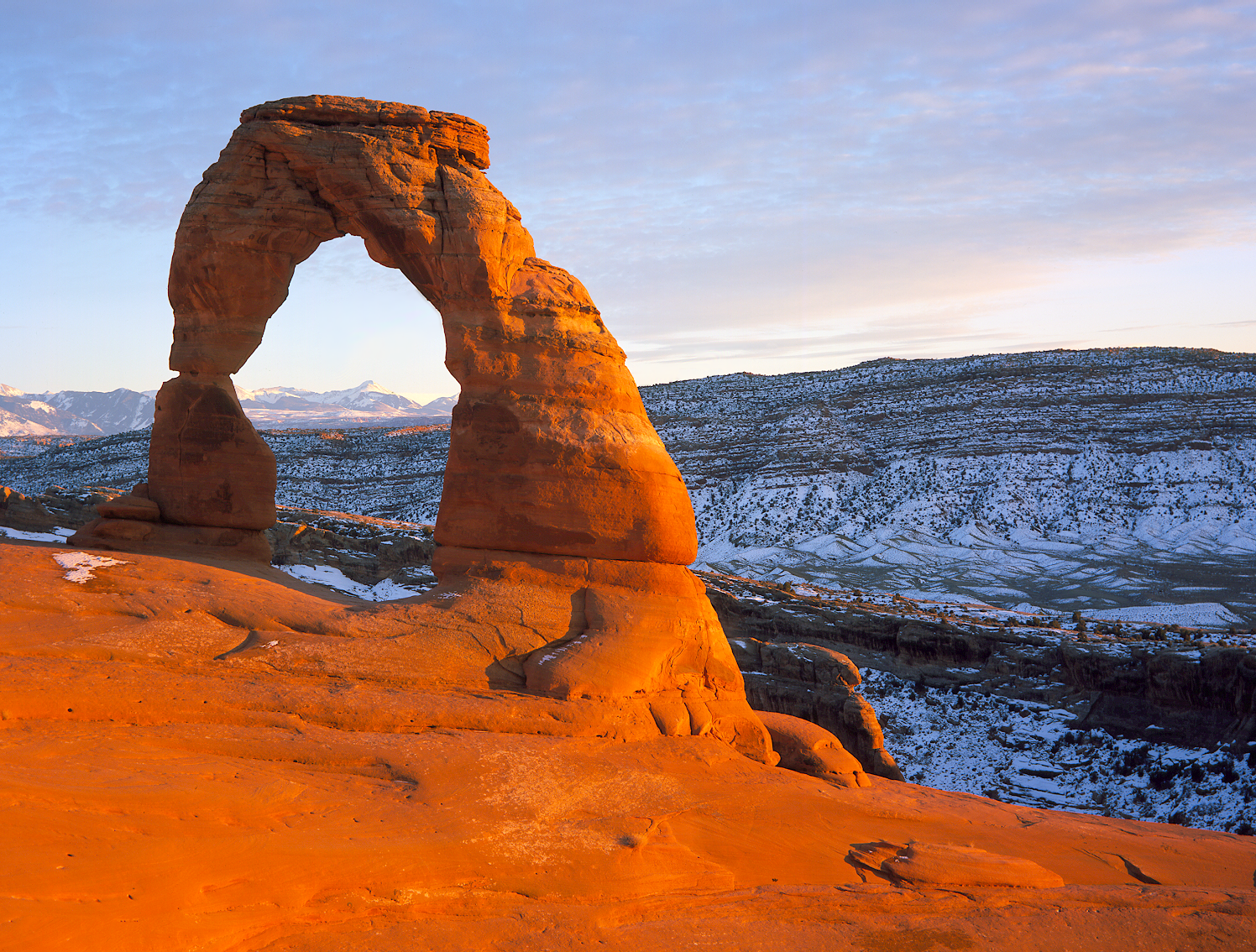
Delicate Arch: Vertical Arch formed in National Park

Although the park's terrain may appear rugged and durable, it is extremely fragile. More than 1 million visitors each year threaten the fragile high-desert ecosystem. The problem lies within the soil's crust, which is composed of cyanobacteria, algae, fungi, and lichens that grow in the dusty parts of the park. Factors that make Arches National Park sensitive to visitor damage include being a semiarid region, the scarce, unpredictable rainfall, lack of deep freezing, and lack of plant litter, which results in soils that have both a low resistance to and slow recovery from, compressional forces such as foot traffic. Methods of indicating effects on the soil are cytophobic soil crust index, measuring of water infiltration, and t-tests that are used to compare the values from the undisturbed and disturbed areas.

=== Arch formation ===
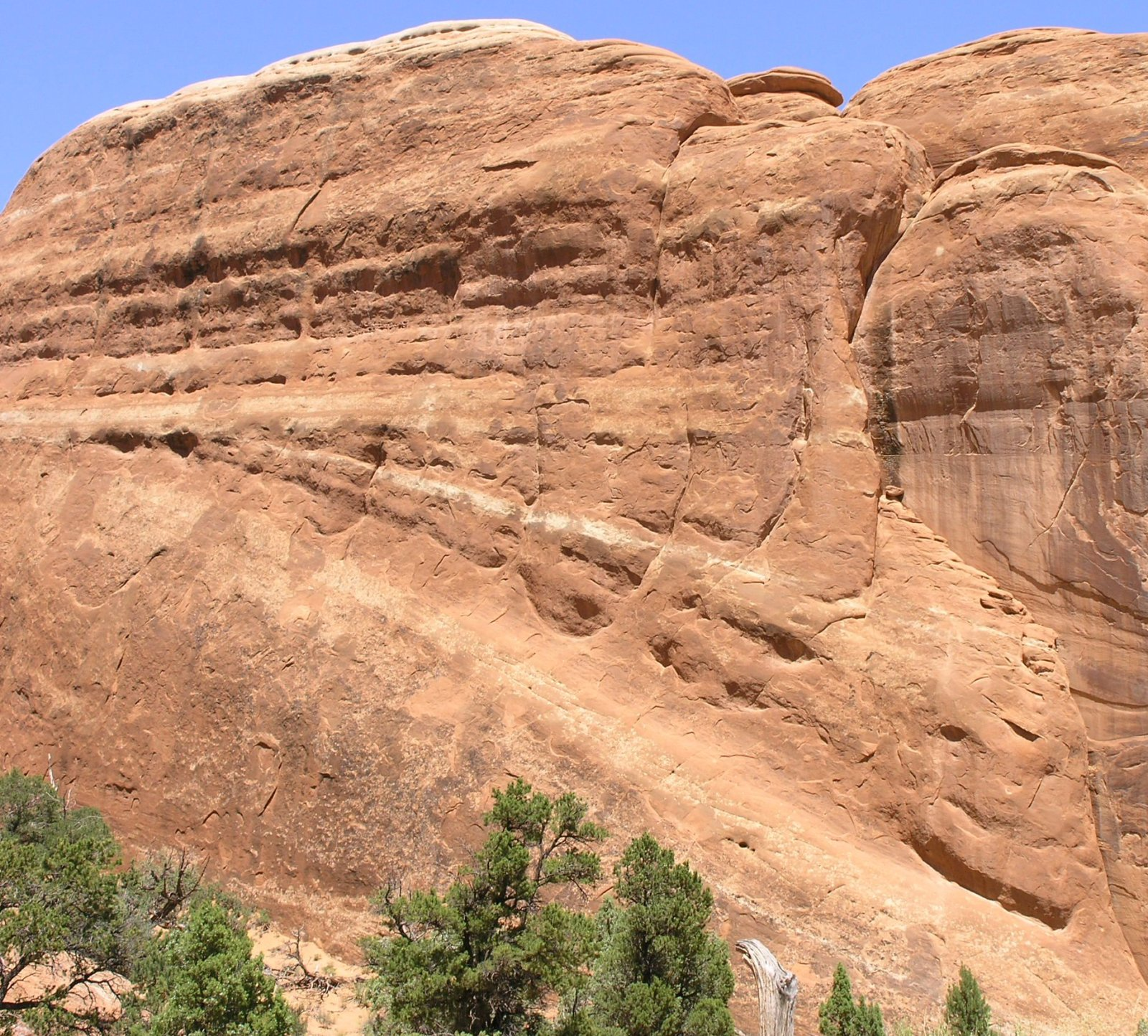
Entrada Sandstone: Crossbedded rock layers formed within the Entrada Sandstone that make up Arches National Park

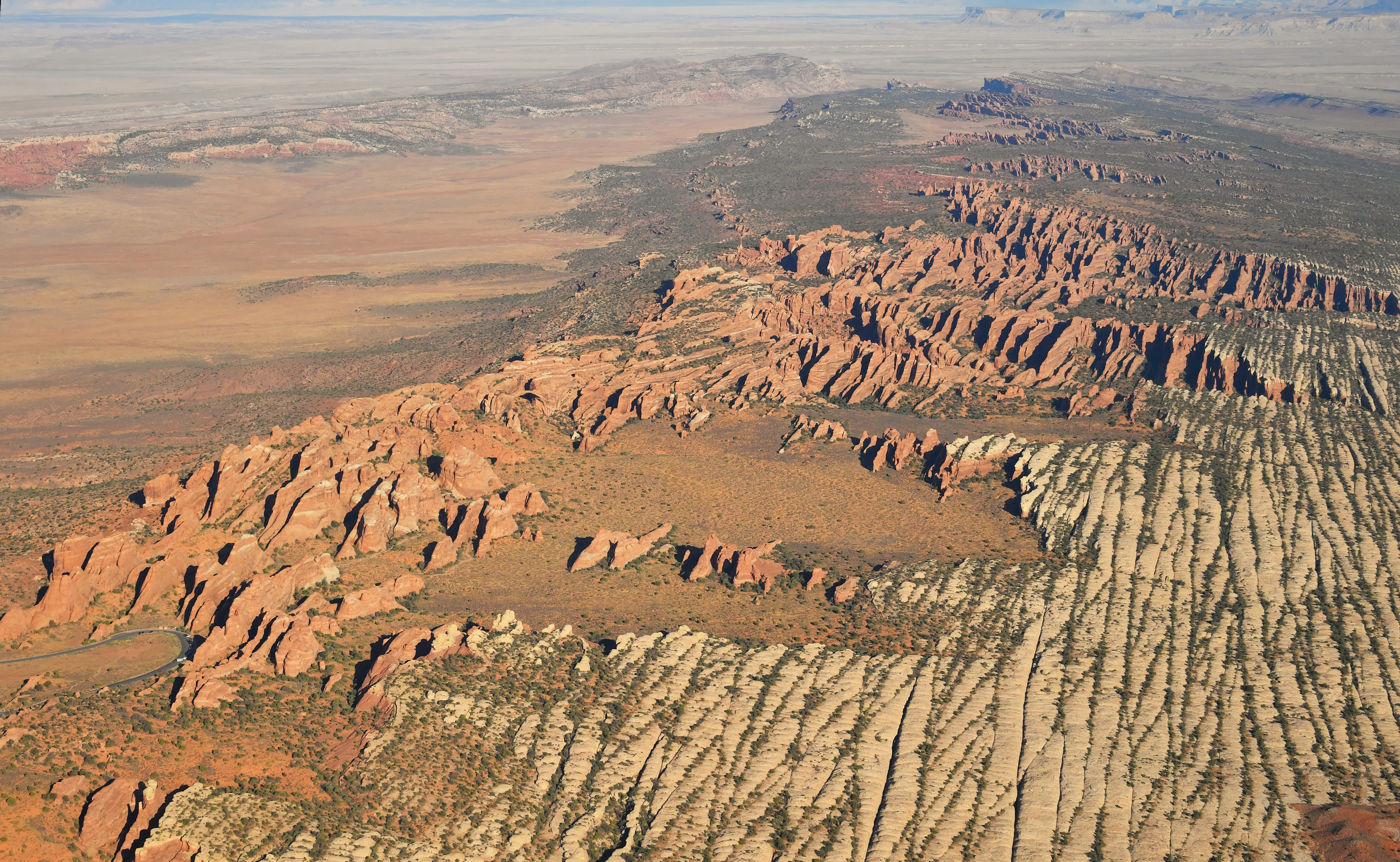
Fins in Devils Garden

Geological processes that occurred over 300 million years ago caused a salt bed to be deposited, which today lies beneath the landscape of Arches National Park. Over time, the salt bed was covered with sediments that eventually compressed into rock layers that have since been named Entrada Sandstone. Rock layers surrounding the edge of the salt bed continued to erode and shift into vertical sandstone walls called fins. Sand collected between vertical walls of the fins, then slightly acidic rain combined with carbon dioxide in the air allowed for the chemical formation of carbonic acid within the trapped sand. Over time, the carbonic acid dissolved the calcium carbonate that held the sandstone together. Many of the rock formations have weaker layers of rock on bottom that are holding stronger layers on top. The weaker layers would dissolve first, creating openings in the rock. Gravity caused pieces of the stronger rock layer to fall piece by piece into an arch shape. Arches form within rock fins at points of intense fracturing localization, or weak points in the rock's formation, caused by horizontal and vertical discontinuities. Lastly, water, wind, and time continued this erosion process and ultimately created the arches of Arches National Park. Most arches in the park occur in the Dewey Bridge Member of the Carmel Formation, the Slick Rock Member of the Entrada Sandstone, and the Moab Member of the Curtis Formation. Horizontal arches (also called pothole arches) are formed when a vertical pothole formation meets a horizontal cave, causing a union into a long arch structure. Over time, erosion destroys existing arches and forms new ones.

=== Climate ===
According to the Köppen climate classification system, Arches Visitor Center has a cold semi-arid climate (BSk).

Climate data for Arches National Park Headquarters, Utah, 1991–2020 normals, extremes 1980–present
| Month | Jan | Feb | Mar | Apr | May | Jun | Jul | Aug | Sep | Oct | Nov | Dec | Year |
|---|---|---|---|---|---|---|---|---|---|---|---|---|---|
| Record high °F (°C) | 63 (17) | 74 (23) | 93 (34) | 93 (34) | 105 (41) | 110 (43) | 116 (47) | 109 (43) | 105 (41) | 95 (35) | 79 (26) | 69 (21) | 116 (47) |
| Mean maximum °F (°C) | 54.8 (12.7) | 64.6 (18.1) | 77.2 (25.1) | 85.8 (29.9) | 95.0 (35.0) | 104.2 (40.1) | 107.3 (41.8) | 104.2 (40.1) | 99.0 (37.2) | 88.5 (31.4) | 70.7 (21.5) | 56.4 (13.6) | 108.0 (42.2) |
| Mean daily maximum °F (°C) | 41.5 (5.3) | 50.0 (10.0) | 62.1 (16.7) | 69.6 (20.9) | 80.1 (26.7) | 92.5 (33.6) | 98.7 (37.1) | 95.8 (35.4) | 87.1 (30.6) | 72.1 (22.3) | 55.9 (13.3) | 41.9 (5.5) | 70.6 (21.4) |
| Daily mean °F (°C) | 31.9 (−0.1) | 39.6 (4.2) | 49.5 (9.7) | 56.7 (13.7) | 66.6 (19.2) | 77.8 (25.4) | 84.5 (29.2) | 81.9 (27.7) | 72.7 (22.6) | 58.1 (14.5) | 44.3 (6.8) | 32.9 (0.5) | 58.0 (14.4) |
| Mean daily minimum °F (°C) | 22.3 (−5.4) | 29.1 (−1.6) | 36.9 (2.7) | 43.7 (6.5) | 53.0 (11.7) | 63.0 (17.2) | 70.3 (21.3) | 67.9 (19.9) | 58.3 (14.6) | 44.2 (6.8) | 32.6 (0.3) | 23.9 (−4.5) | 45.4 (7.4) |
| Mean minimum °F (°C) | 10.7 (−11.8) | 16.8 (−8.4) | 24.8 (−4.0) | 30.6 (−0.8) | 39.1 (3.9) | 49.1 (9.5) | 58.2 (14.6) | 57.8 (14.3) | 43.1 (6.2) | 29.1 (−1.6) | 18.8 (−7.3) | 10.7 (−11.8) | 7.4 (−13.7) |
| Record low °F (°C) | −4 (−20) | −8 (−22) | 13 (−11) | 21 (−6) | 28 (−2) | 37 (3) | 50 (10) | 44 (7) | 26 (−3) | 16 (−9) | 10 (−12) | −4 (−20) | −8 (−22) |
| Average precipitation inches (mm) | 0.55 (14) | 0.56 (14) | 0.65 (17) | 0.71 (18) | 0.75 (19) | 0.43 (11) | 0.73 (19) | 0.90 (23) | 0.88 (22) | 1.12 (28) | 0.56 (14) | 0.61 (15) | 8.45 (215) |
| Average snowfall inches (cm) | 2.1 (5.3) | 1.2 (3.0) | 0.5 (1.3) | 0.0 (0.0) | 0.0 (0.0) | 0.0 (0.0) | 0.0 (0.0) | 0.0 (0.0) | 0.0 (0.0) | 0.1 (0.25) | 0.7 (1.8) | 3.5 (8.9) | 8.1 (21) |
| Average precipitation days (≥ 0.01 in) | 4.2 | 4.5 | 4.9 | 5.0 | 4.8 | 2.4 | 4.7 | 6.0 | 4.9 | 5.5 | 4.1 | 3.8 | 54.8 |
| Average snowy days (≥ 0.1 in) | 1.5 | 0.9 | 0.3 | 0.0 | 0.0 | 0.0 | 0.0 | 0.0 | 0.0 | 0.1 | 0.4 | 2.1 | 5.3 |
Source: NOAA

Mean daily daylight hours for Arches National Park
| Month | Jan | Feb | Mar | Apr | May | Jun | Jul | Aug | Sep | Oct | Nov | Dec | Year |
|---|---|---|---|---|---|---|---|---|---|---|---|---|---|
| Mean daily daylight hours | 10.0 | 10.5 | 12.0 | 13.0 | 14.0 | 15.0 | 14.5 | 13.5 | 12.5 | 11.5 | 10.0 | 9.5 | 12.2 |
Source: Weather Atlas

== Plants and animals ==
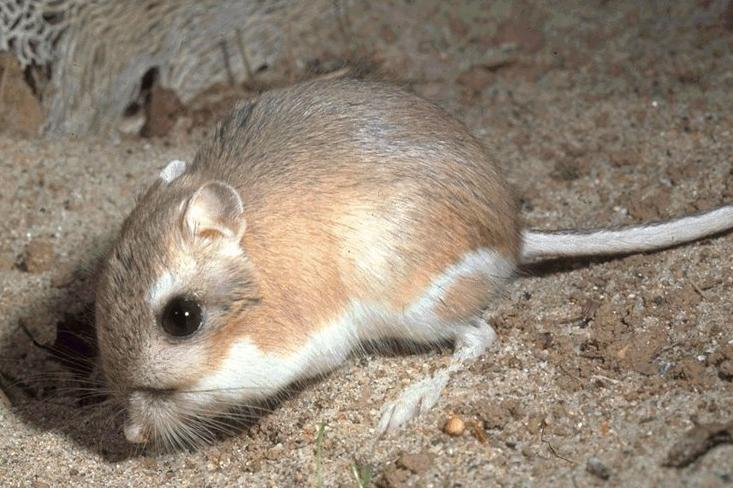
A kangaroo rat

An abundance of wildlife occurs in Arches National Park, including spadefoot toads, antelope squirrels, scrub jays, peregrine falcons, many kinds of sparrows, red foxes, desert bighorn sheep, kangaroo rats, mule deers, cougars, midget faded rattlesnakes, yucca moths, western rattlesnakes, and collared lizards.

Dead juniper and desert shrubs on sand in Arches National Park, Utah, 2026

A number of plant species are common in the park, including prickly pear cactus, Indian ricegrass, bunch grasses, cheatgrass, moss, liverworts, Utah juniper, Mormon tea, blackbrush, cliffrose, four-winged saltbrush, pinyon pine, evening primrose, sand verbena, yucca, and sacred datura.

Biological soil crust consisting of cyanobacteria, lichen, mosses, green algae, and microfungi is found throughout southeastern Utah. The fibrous growths help keep soil particles together, creating a layer that is more resistant to erosion. The living soil layer readily absorbs and stores water, allowing more complex forms of plant life to grow in places with low precipitation levels.

== History ==
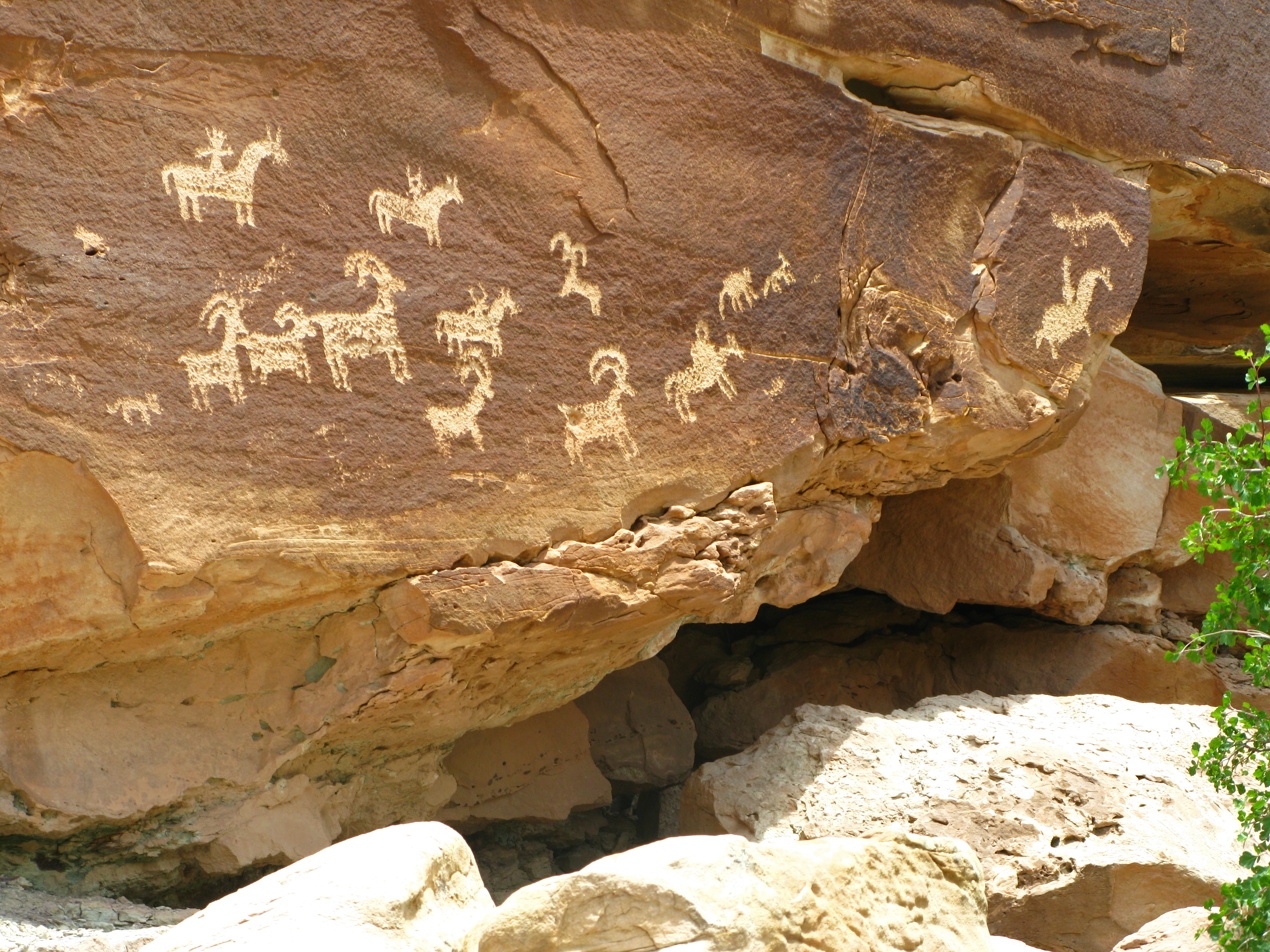
Ute petroglyphs on Delicate Arch trail

Hunter-gatherers migrated into the area about 10,000 years ago, at the end of an ice age, and found pockets of chert and chalcedony in Courthouse Wash and Salt Valley that they worked into stone tools. Roughly two thousand years ago some of these groups began farming, and ancestral Puebloan farming in the region peaked between 500 and 1300 CE. Few dwellings have been found in Arches, which lay at the northern edge of ancestral Puebloan territory, so it may have been visited only seasonally. Fremont-era cultures were their contemporaries to the northwest. Around 1300 CE many ancestral Puebloans migrated south. The Spanish Domínguez–Escalante expedition passed through Ute and Paiute homelands in 1776, the first people of European descent known to have visited Utah. The first European-Americans to attempt settlement in the area were the Mormon Elk Mountain Mission of 1855, who built a fort in the Moab valley but were driven out after four months. Ranchers and homesteaders began settling the valley in the 1870s. Word of the beauty of the surrounding rock formations spread beyond the settlement as a possible tourist destination.

The Arches area was first brought to the attention of the National Park Service by Frank A. Wadleigh, passenger traffic manager of the Denver and Rio Grande Western Railroad. Wadleigh, accompanied by railroad photographer George L. Beam, visited the area in September 1923 at the invitation of Alexander Ringhoffer, a Hungarian-born prospector living in Salt Valley. Ringhoffer had written to the railroad to interest them in the tourist potential of a scenic area he had discovered the previous year with his two sons and a son-in-law, which he called the Devils Garden (known today as the Klondike Bluffs). Wadleigh was impressed by what Ringhoffer showed him, and suggested to Park Service director Stephen T. Mather that the area be made a national monument.

In February 1925, additional support for the monument idea came from Laurence Gould, a University of Michigan graduate student (and future polar explorer) studying the geology of the nearby La Sal Mountains, who visited the Windows on a side trip and wrote to Utah senator Reed Smoot urging that it be protected.

Landscape Arch in the Devils Garden, the longest in the park and the fifth-longest in the world

A succession of government investigators examined the area, in part due to confusion as to the precise location. In the process, the name Devils Garden was transposed to an area on the opposite side of Salt Valley that includes Landscape Arch, the longest arch in the park. Ringhoffer's original discovery was omitted, while another area nearby, known locally as the Windows, was included. Designation of the area as a national monument was supported by the Park Service in 1926 but was resisted by President Calvin Coolidge's Interior Secretary, Hubert Work. Finally, in April 1929, shortly after his inauguration, President Herbert Hoover signed a presidential proclamation creating the Arches National Monument, consisting of two comparatively small, disconnected sections. The purpose of the reservation under the 1906 Antiquities Act was to protect the arches, spires, balanced rocks, and other sandstone formations for their scientific and educational value. The name Arches was suggested in July 1925 by Frank Pinkley, superintendent of the Park Service's southwestern national monuments, following a visit to the Windows section.

In November 1938, President Franklin D. Roosevelt signed a proclamation that expanded the monument by 29,160 acres to 33,680 acres, bringing Delicate Arch within its boundaries. A small adjustment was made by President Dwight Eisenhower in 1960 to accommodate a new road alignment.

In early 1969, just before leaving office, President Lyndon B. Johnson signed a proclamation substantially enlarging the Arches. Two years later, President Richard Nixon signed legislation enacted by Congress, which significantly reduced the total area enclosed, but changed its status. Arches National Park was formally dedicated in May 1972.

In 1980, vandals attempted to use an abrasive kitchen cleanser to deface ancient petroglyphs in the park, prompting park officials to recruit physicist John F. Asmus, who specialized in using lasers to restore works of art, to use his technology to repair the damage. Asmus "zapped the panel with intense light pulses and succeeded in removing most of the cleanser". In 2016, there was another vandalism event on Frame Arch in the park, where a section of the rock was carved out. Due to advances in technology, in 2018 the arch was repaired through color match and modern infilling methods.

== Recreational activities ==
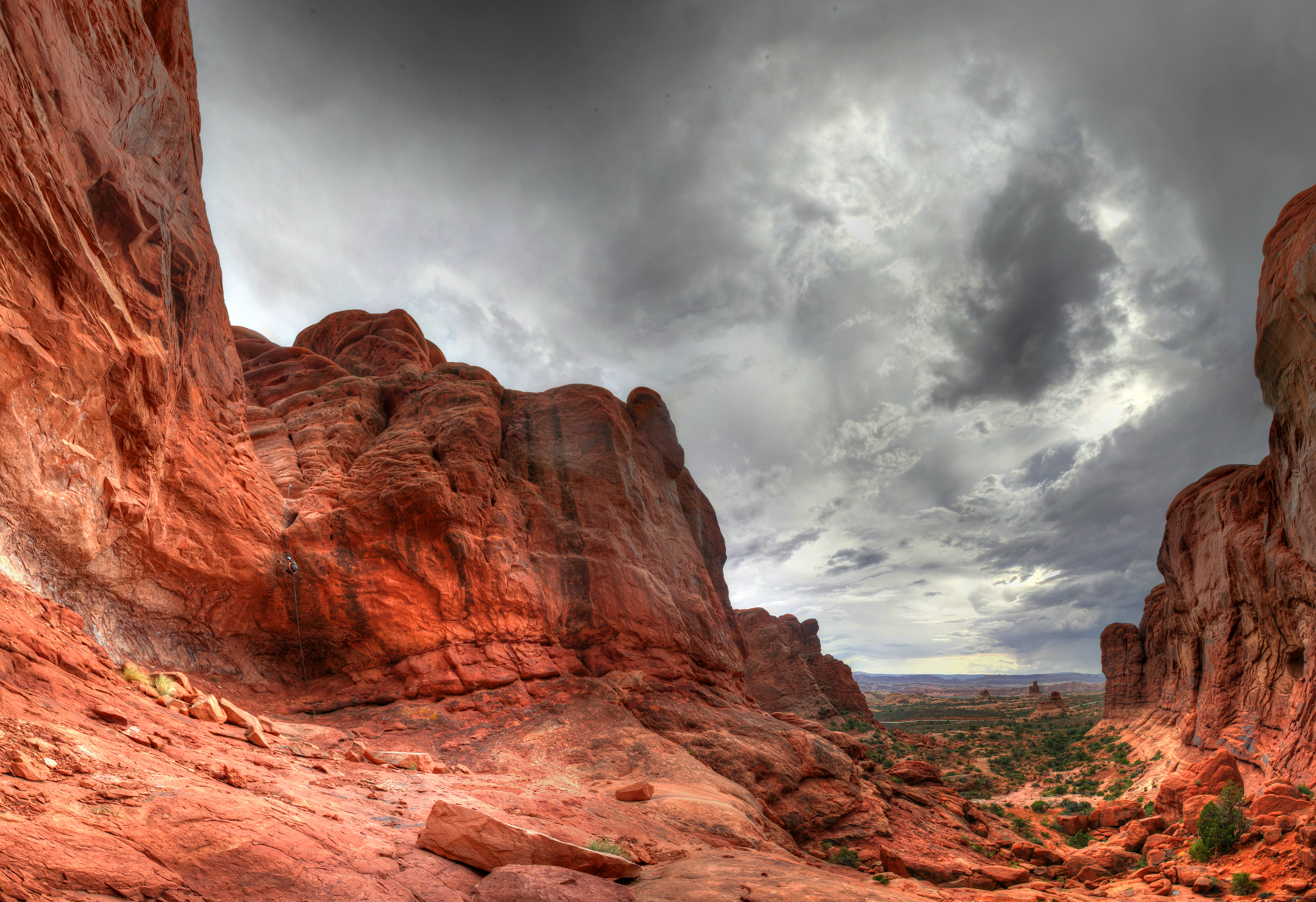
Elephant Butte

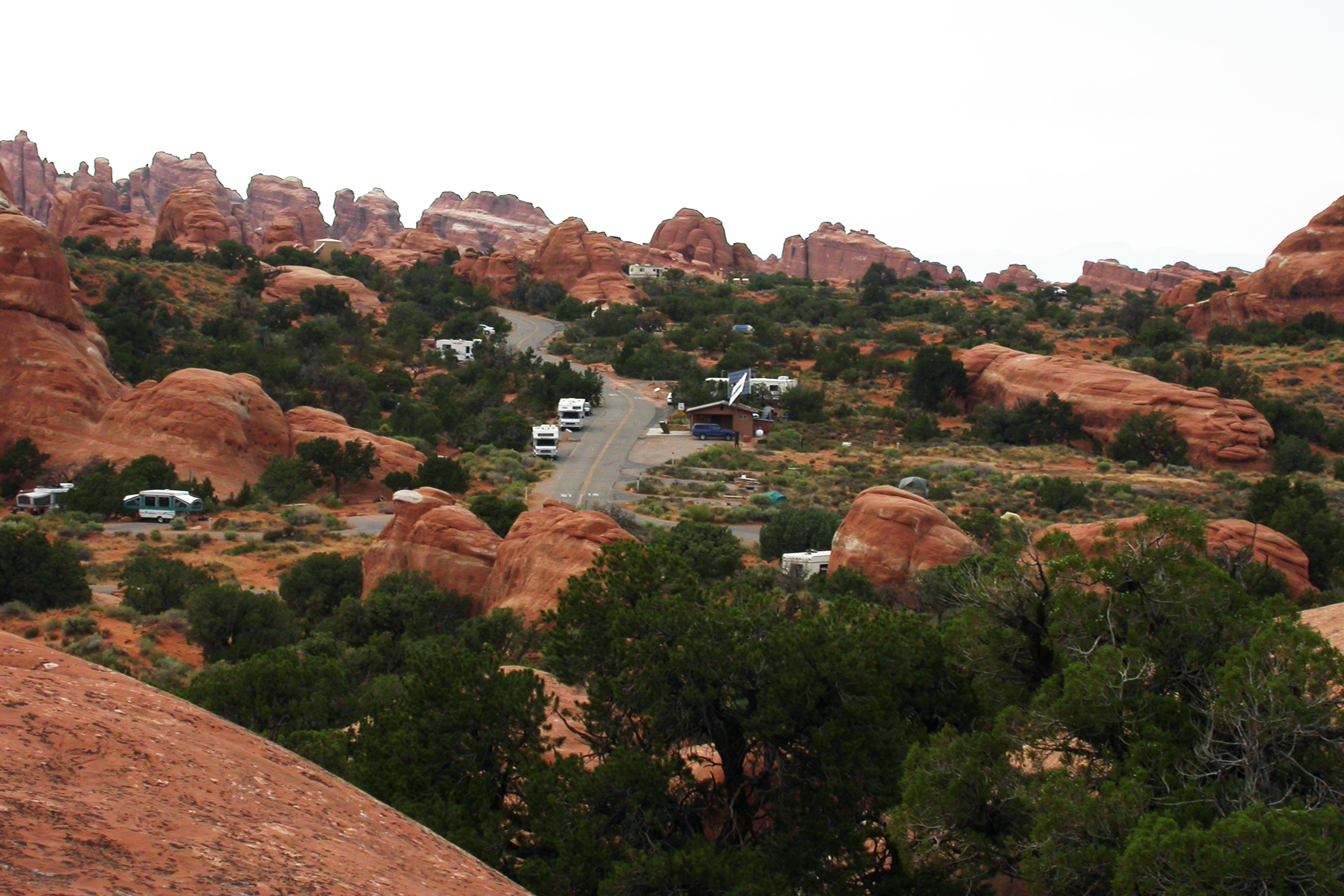
Devils Garden campground, 2005

Climbing Balanced Rock or any named or unnamed arch in Arches National Park with an opening larger than 3 ft (0.9 m) is banned by park regulations. Climbing on other features in the park is allowed but regulated; in addition, slacklining and BASE jumping are banned parkwide.

Climbing on named arches within the park had long been banned by park regulations, but following Dean Potter's successful free climb on Delicate Arch in May 2006, the wording of the regulations was deemed unenforceable by the park attorney. In response, the park revised its regulations later that month, eventually imposing the current ban on arch climbing in 2014.

Approved recreational activities include auto touring on paved and unpaved roads, hiking, bicycling, camping at the Devils Garden campground, backpacking, canyoneering, and rock climbing, with permits required for the last three activities. To protect the biological soil crust, visitors are asked to walk only on trails, rock and sandy washes, and to keep vehicles and bicycles on designated roads. Guided commercial tours and ranger programs are also available.

Astronomy is also popular in the park due to its dark skies, despite the increasing light pollution from towns such as Moab.

== In popular culture ==
Delicate Arch is the subject of the third 2014 quarter of the U.S. Mint's America the Beautiful Quarters program commemorating national parks and historic sites. The Arches quarter had the highest production of the five 2014 national park quarters, with more than 465 million minted.

American writer Edward Abbey was a park ranger at Arches National Monument in 1956 and 1957, where he kept journals that became his book Desert Solitaire. The success of Abbey's book, as well as interest in adventure travel, has drawn many hikers, mountain bikers, and off-pavement driving enthusiasts to the area. The Hayduke Trail, an 812 mi (1,307 km) backpacking route named after one of Edward Abbey's characters, begins in the park.

== Features ==
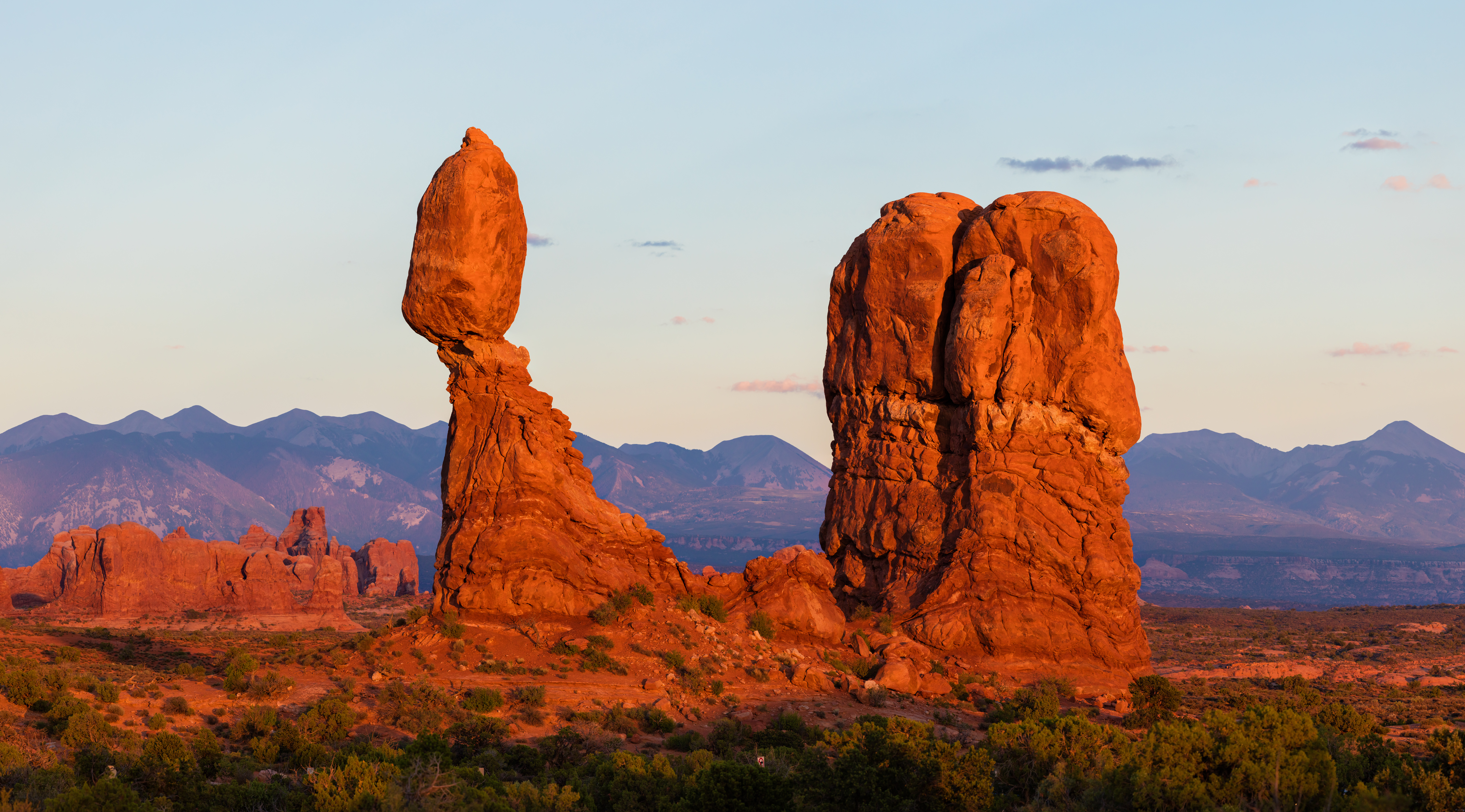
Balanced Rock

- Argon Tower – a 260-ft pillar at Park Avenue
- Balanced Rock – a large balancing rock, the size of three school buses
- Courthouse Towers – a collection of tall stone columns
- Dark Angel – a free-standing 150 ft-tall (46 m) sandstone pillar at the end of the Devils Garden Trail
- Delicate Arch – a lone-standing arch that has become a symbol of Utah and the most recognized arch in the park
- Devils Garden – many arches and columns scattered along a ridge
- Double Arch – two arches that share a common end
- Fiery Furnace – an area of maze-like narrow passages and tall rock columns (see biblical reference, Book of Daniel, chapter 3)
- Landscape Arch – a very thin and long arch in the Devils Garden with a span of 290 ft (88 m) (the longest arch in the park)
- Marching Men – a collection of pillars
  Park Avenue in Arches National Park
- Petrified Dunes – petrified remnants of dunes blown from the ancient lakes that covered the area
- Queen Nefertiti Rock – a formation at Park Avenue
- Queen Victoria Rock – a formation at Park Avenue
- Sheep Rock – a formation north of Park Avenue
- The Organ – a butte towering over the park road
- The Phallus – a rock spire that resembles a phallus
- Three Penguins – a formation near the park entrance
- Tower of Babel – a formation towering over the park road
- Wall Arch – located along the popular Devils Garden Trail; collapsed sometime on August 4/5, 2008
- The Three Gossips –a mid-sized sandstone tower located in the Courthouse Towers area.

== Gallery ==
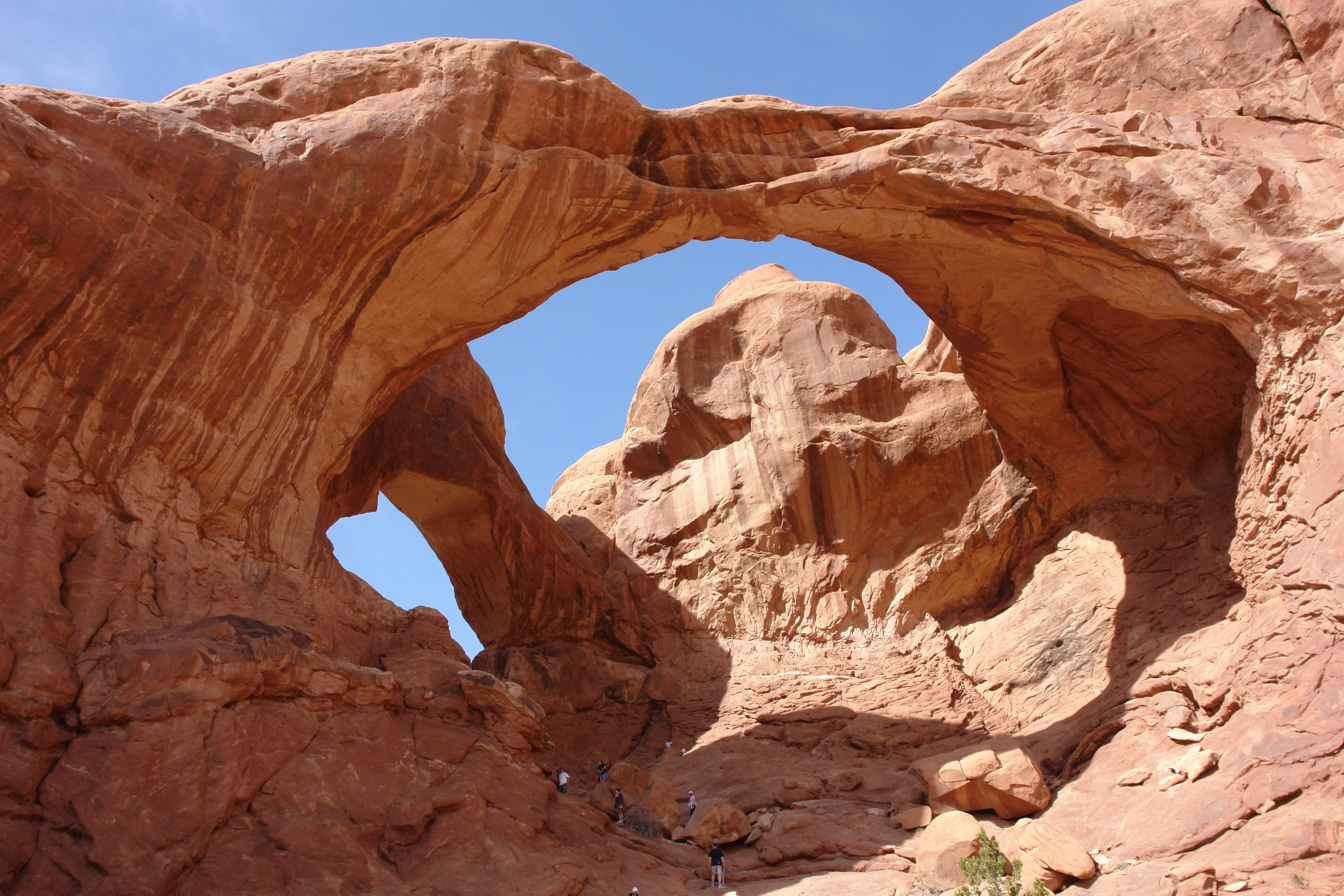
Double Arch

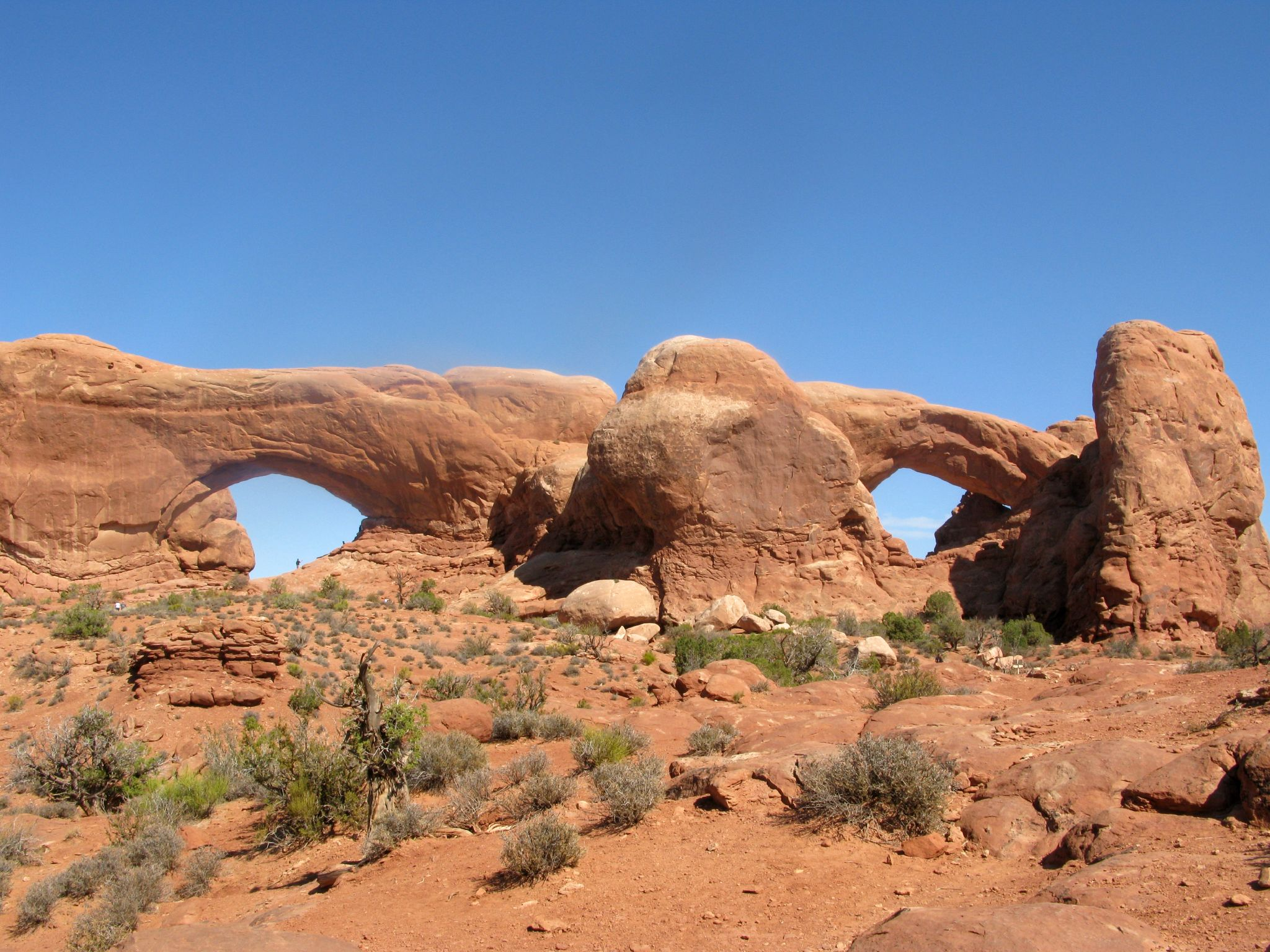
The Windows

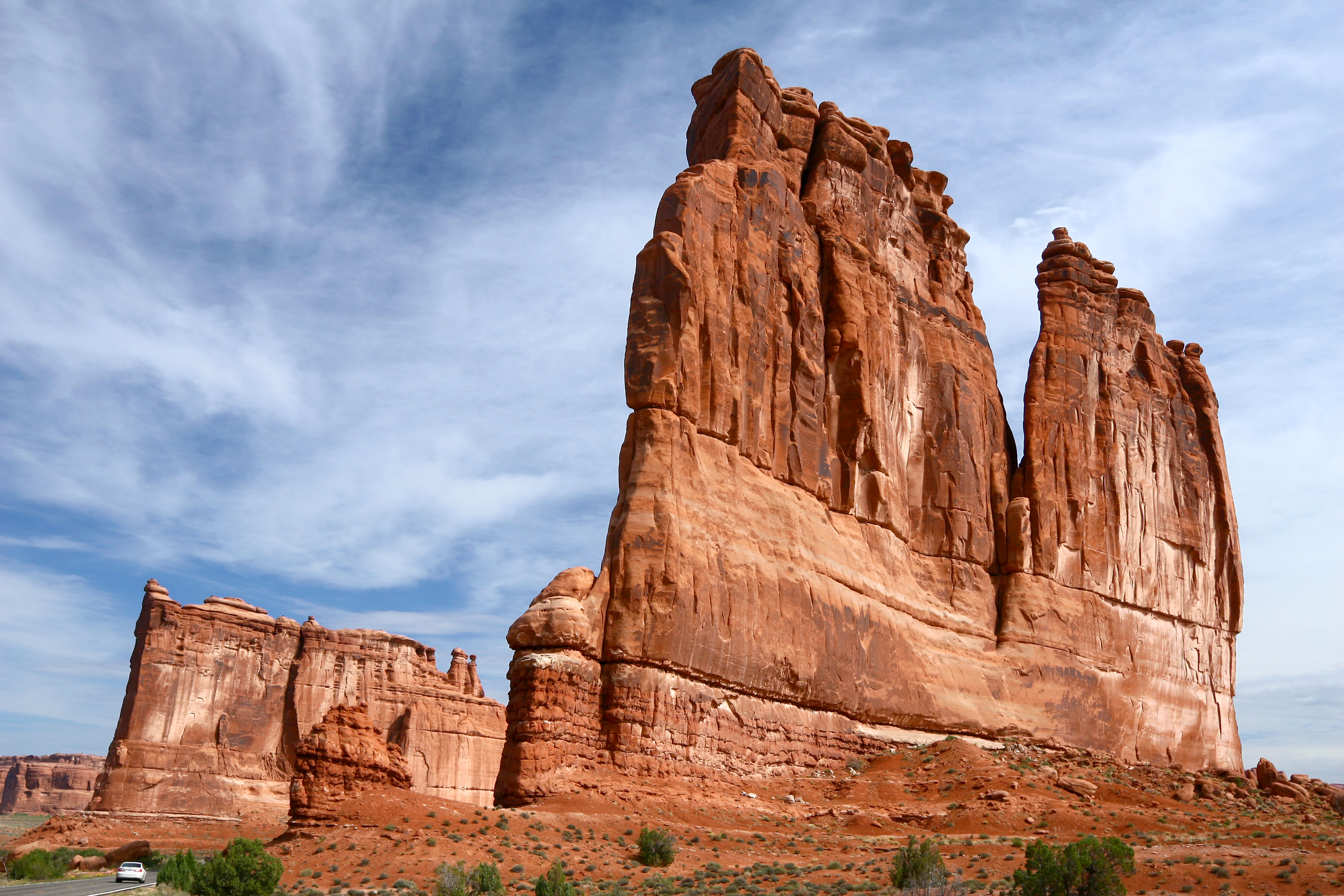
The Organ, a sandstone tower in the Courthouse Towers area

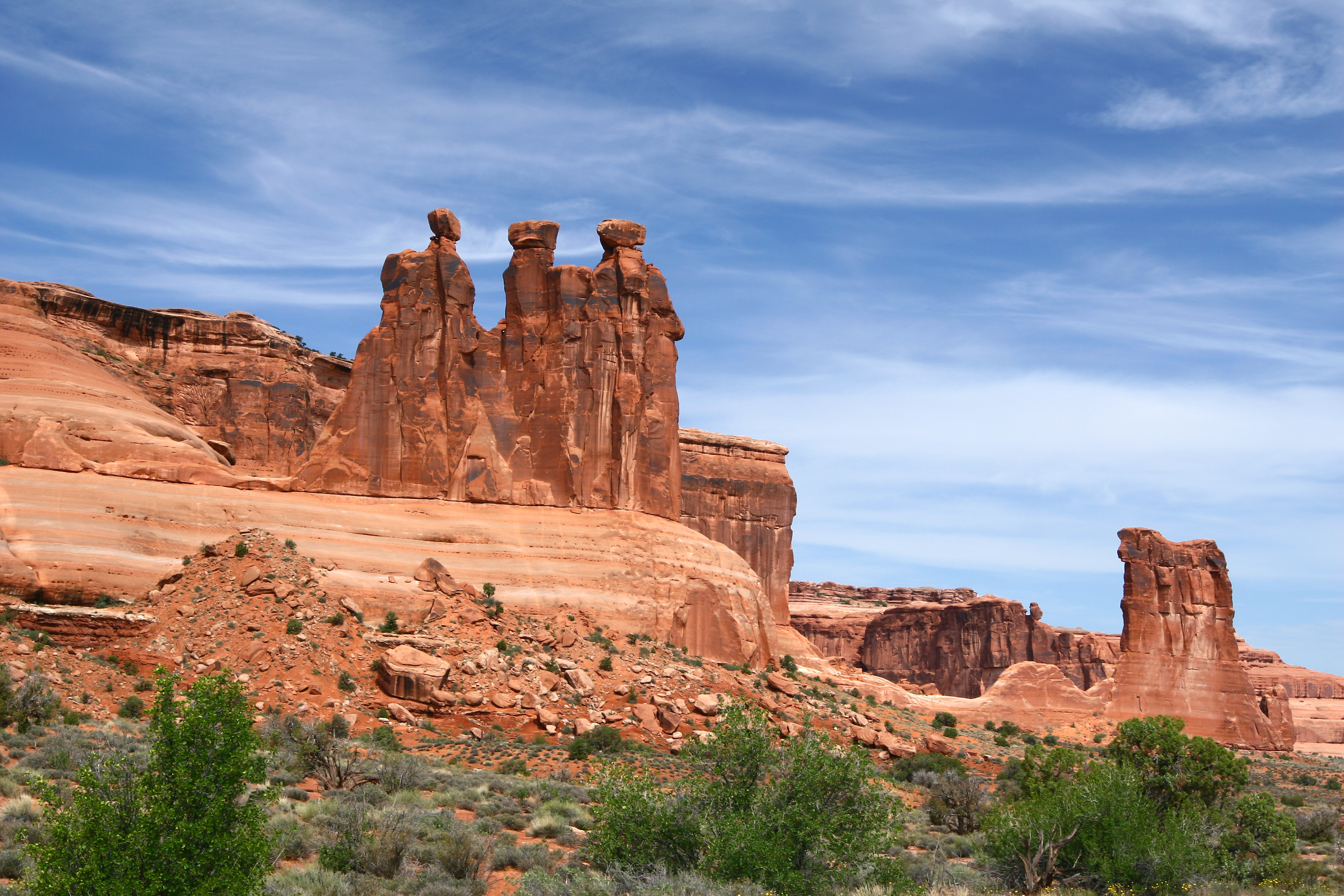
The Three Gossips

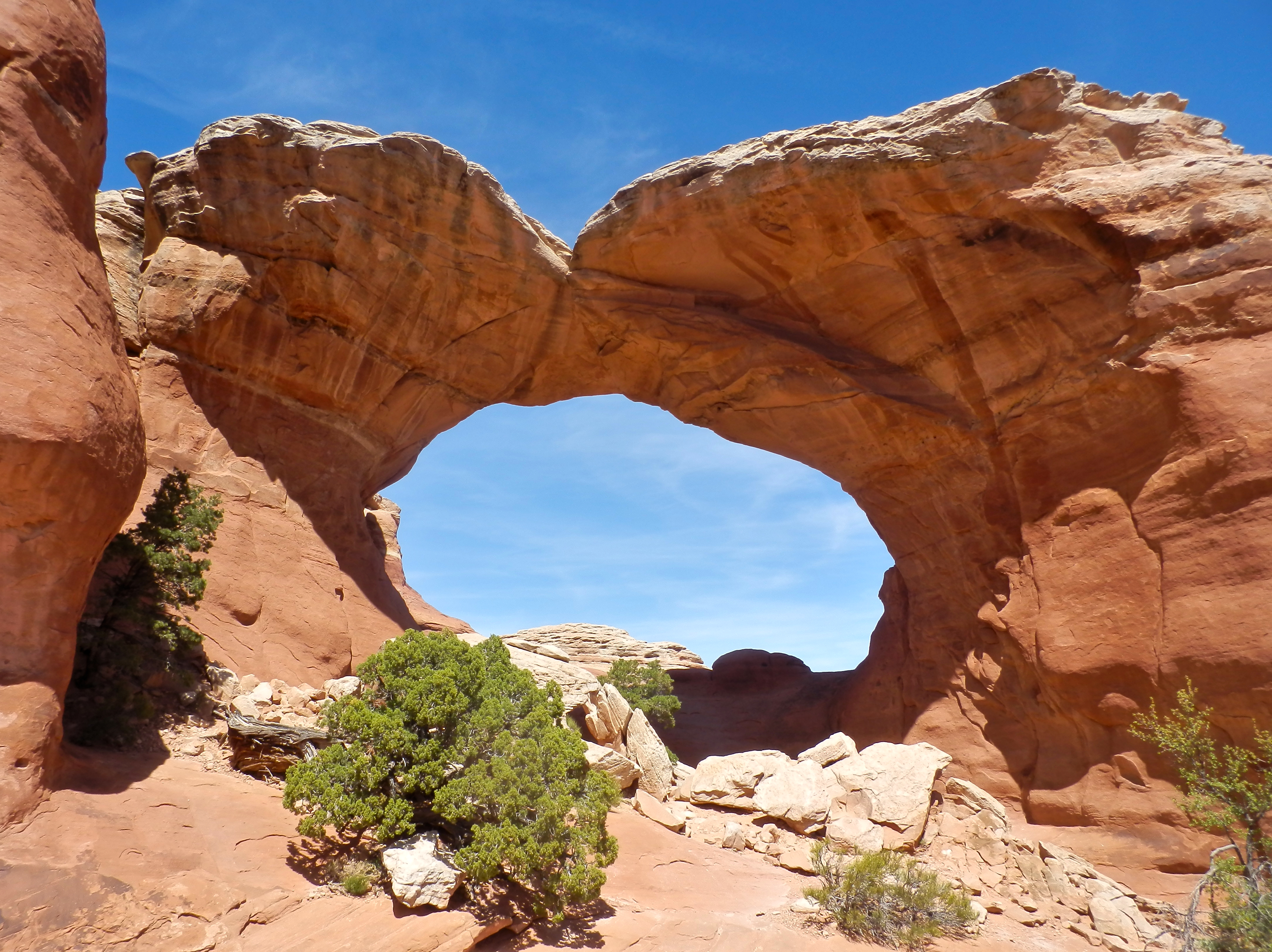
Broken Arch

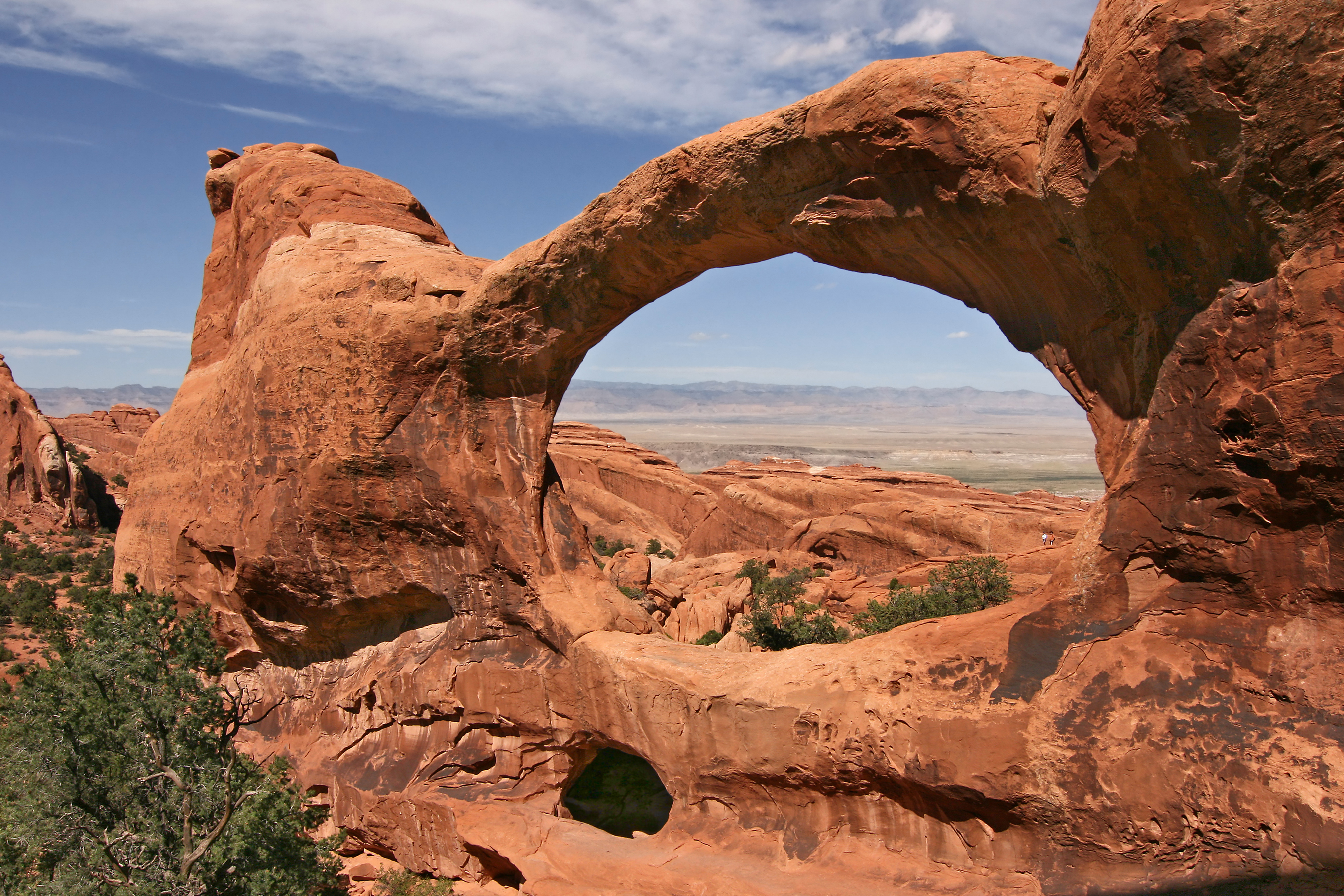
Double O Arch

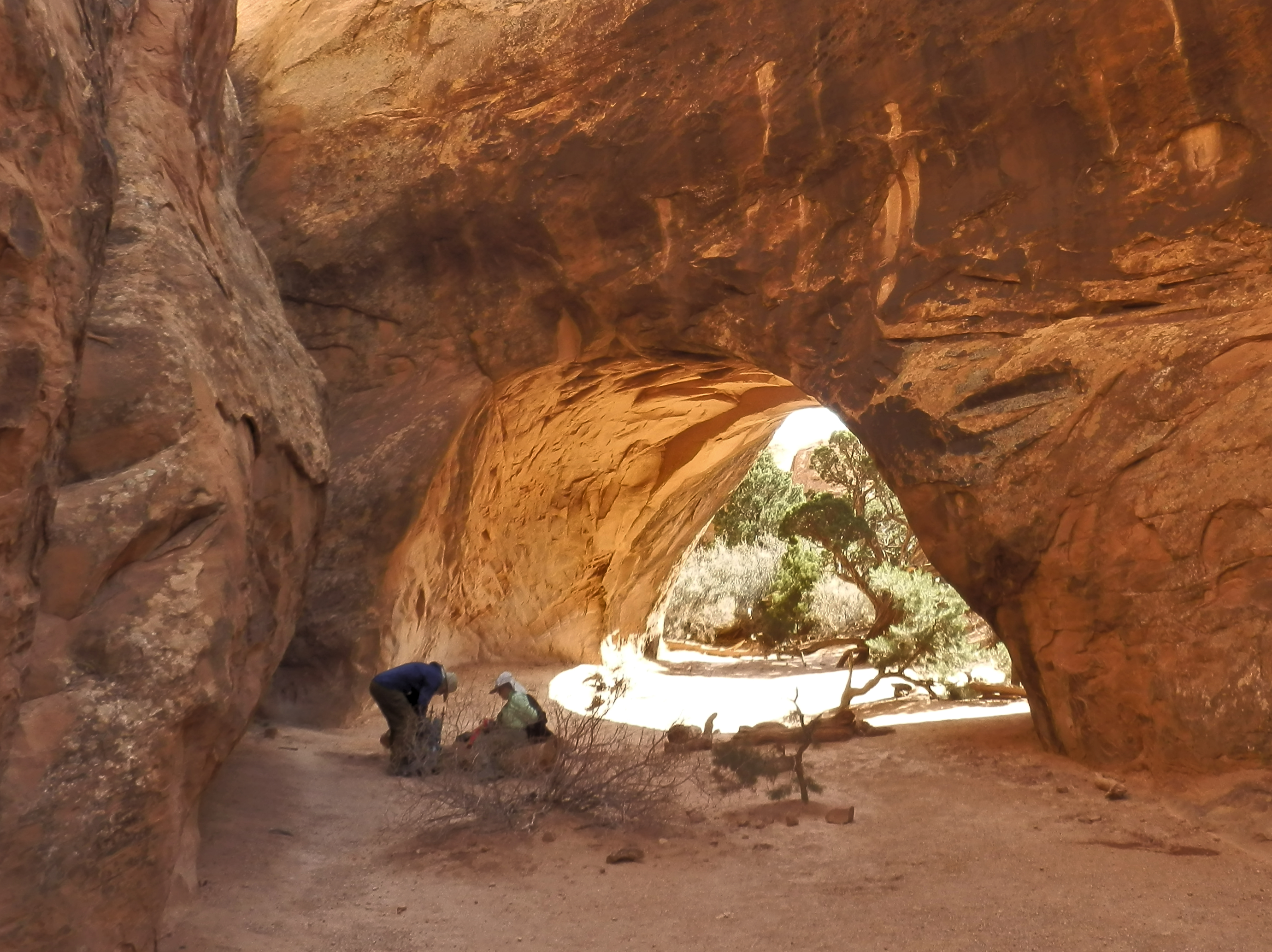
Navajo Arch

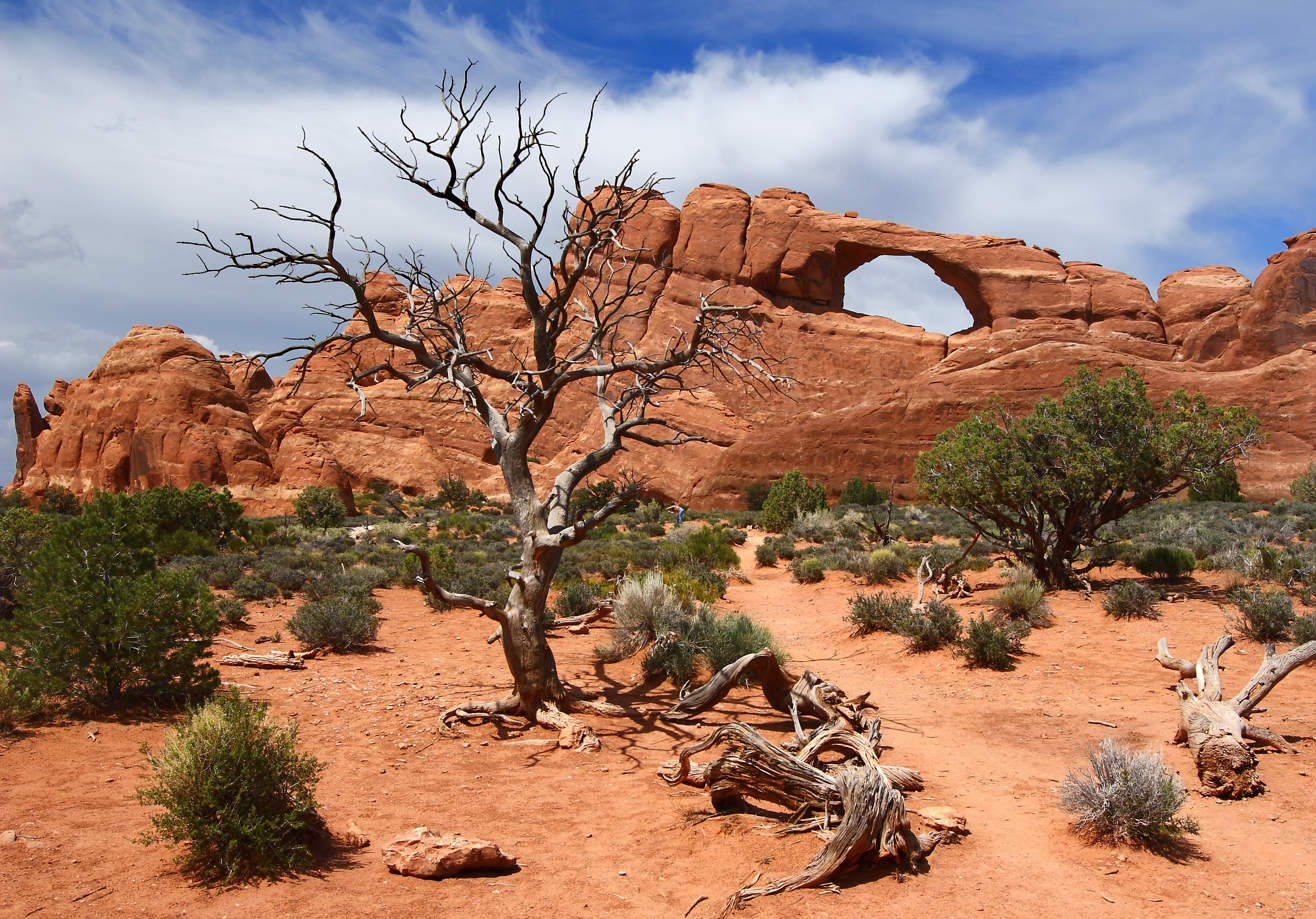
Skyline Arch

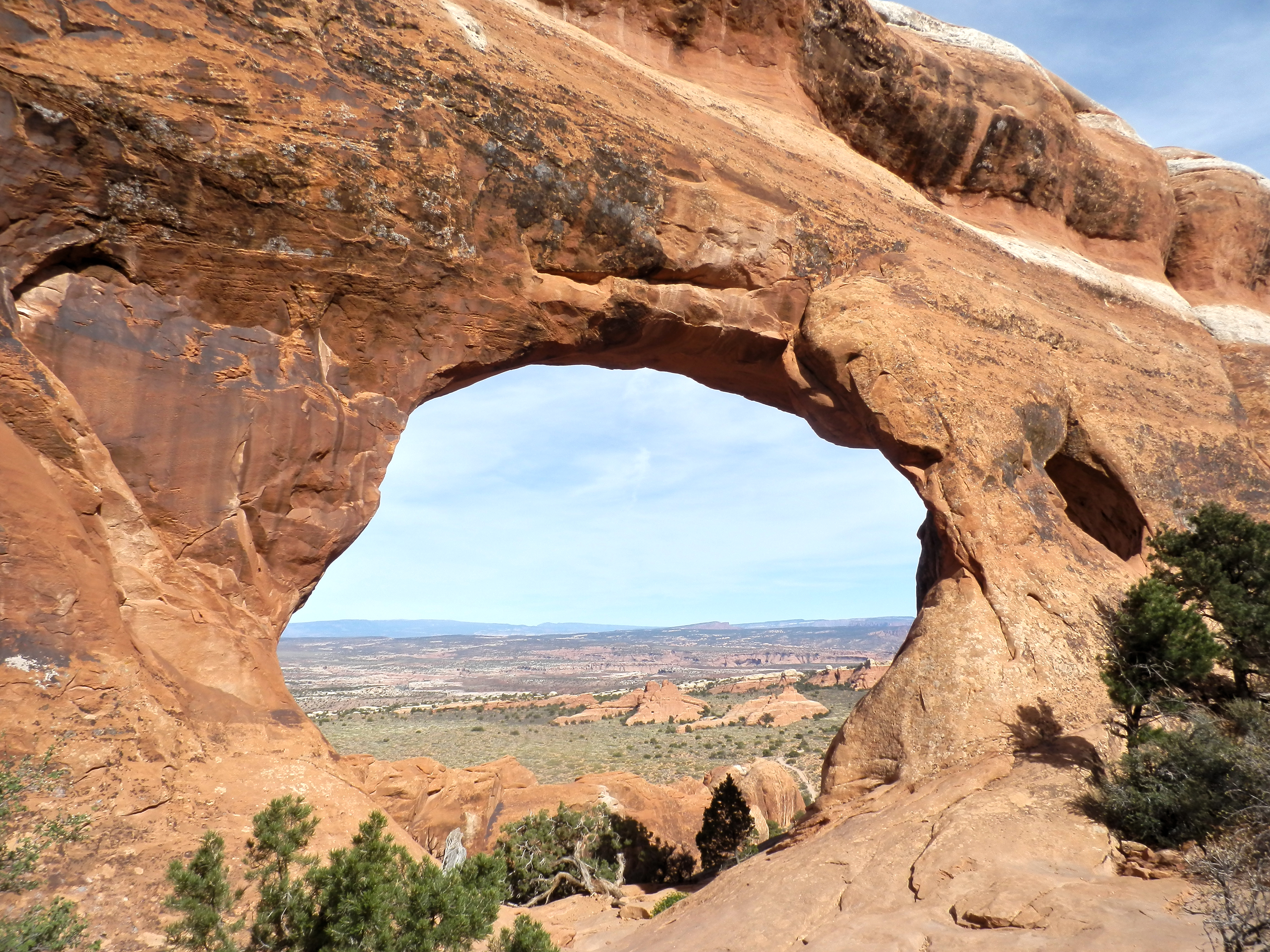
Partition Arch

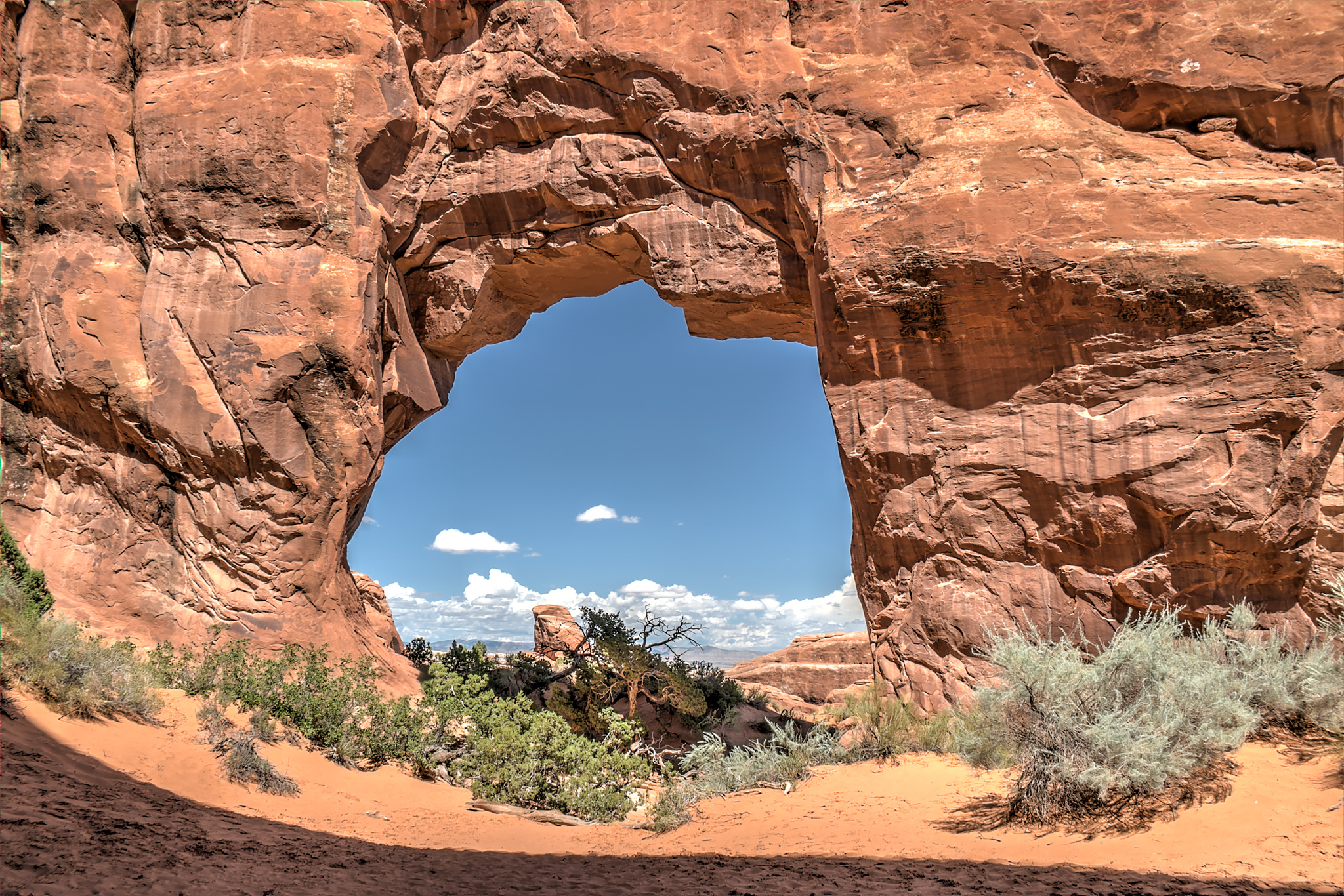
Pine Tree Arch

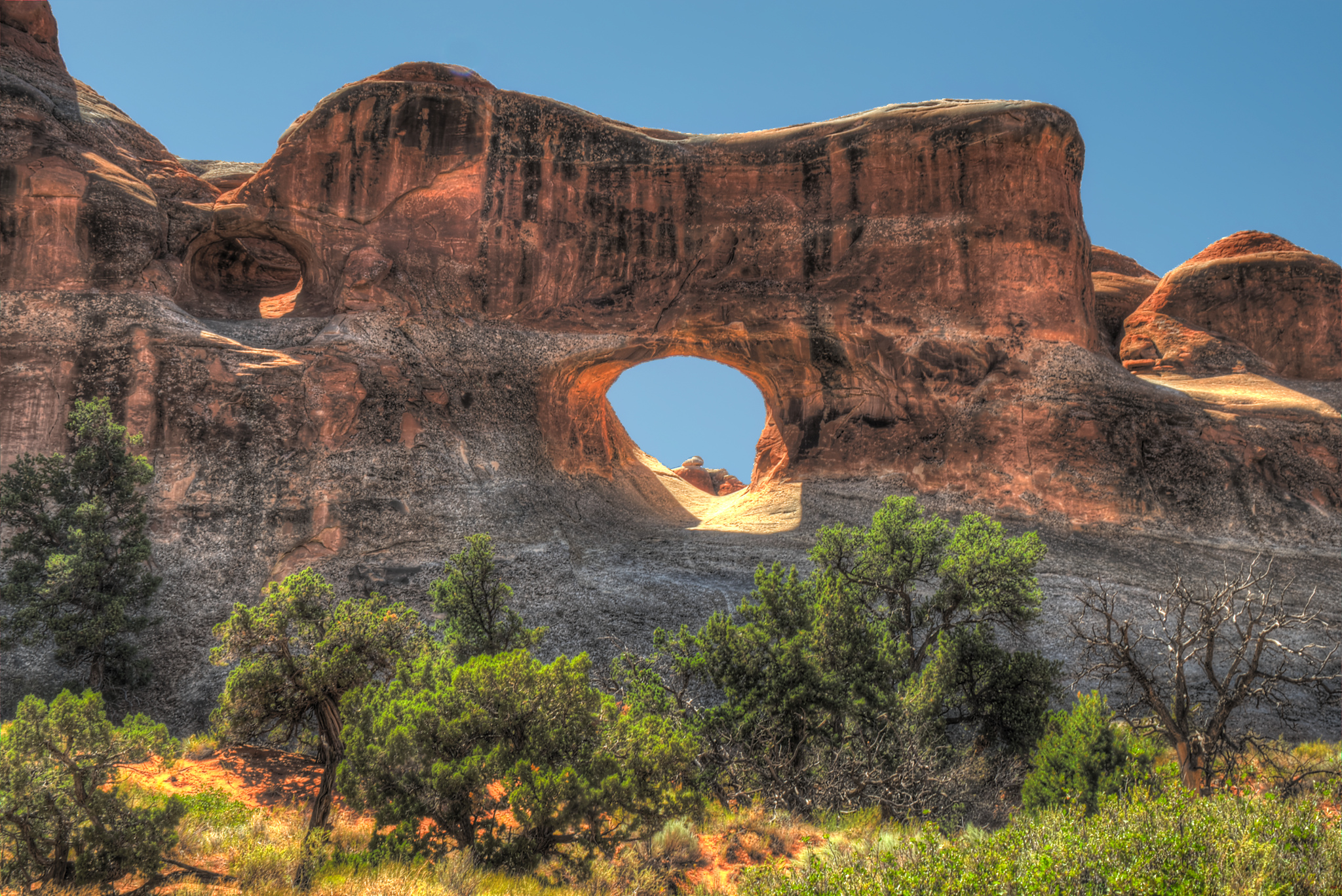
Tunnel Arch

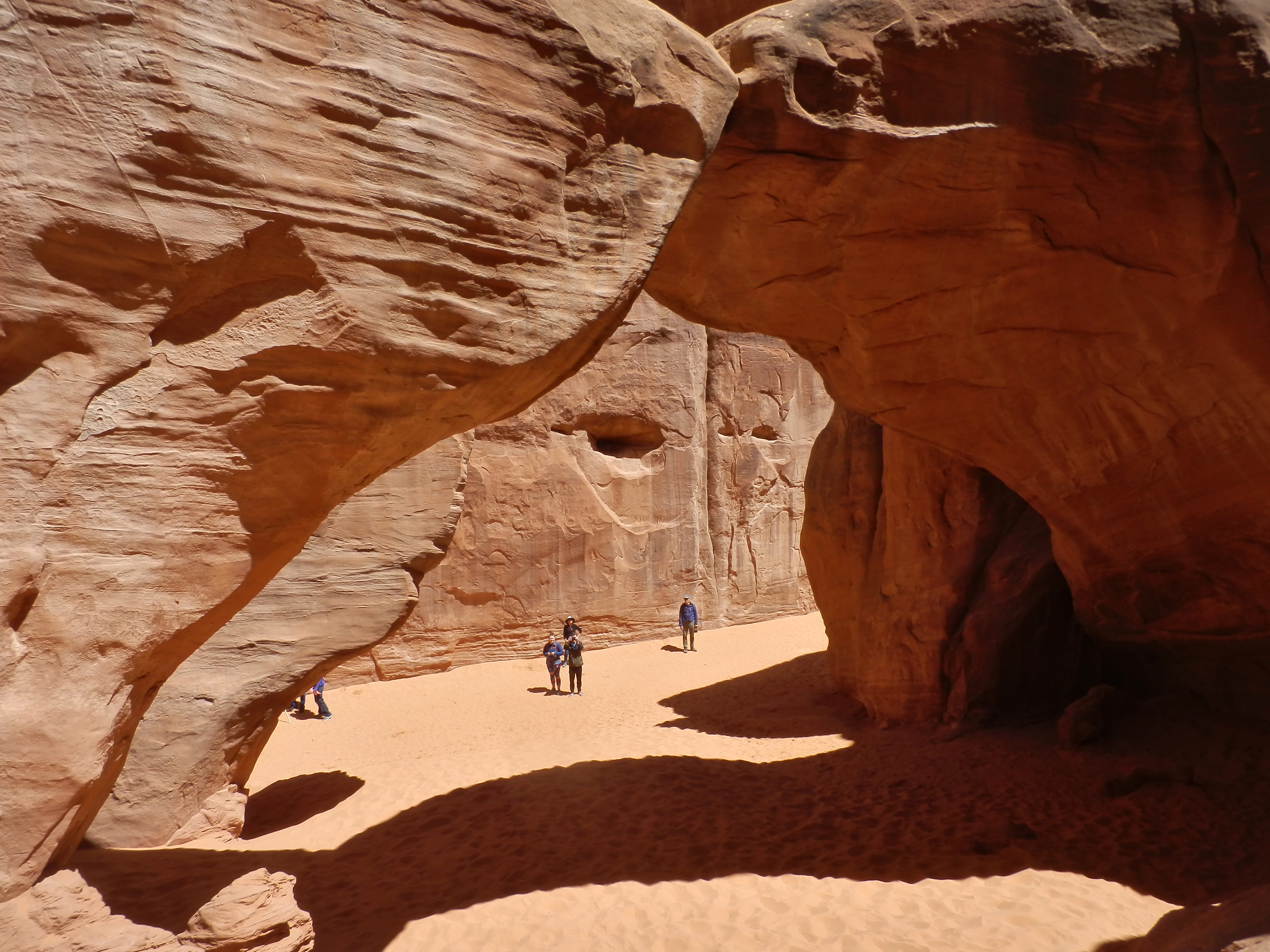
Sand Dune Arch

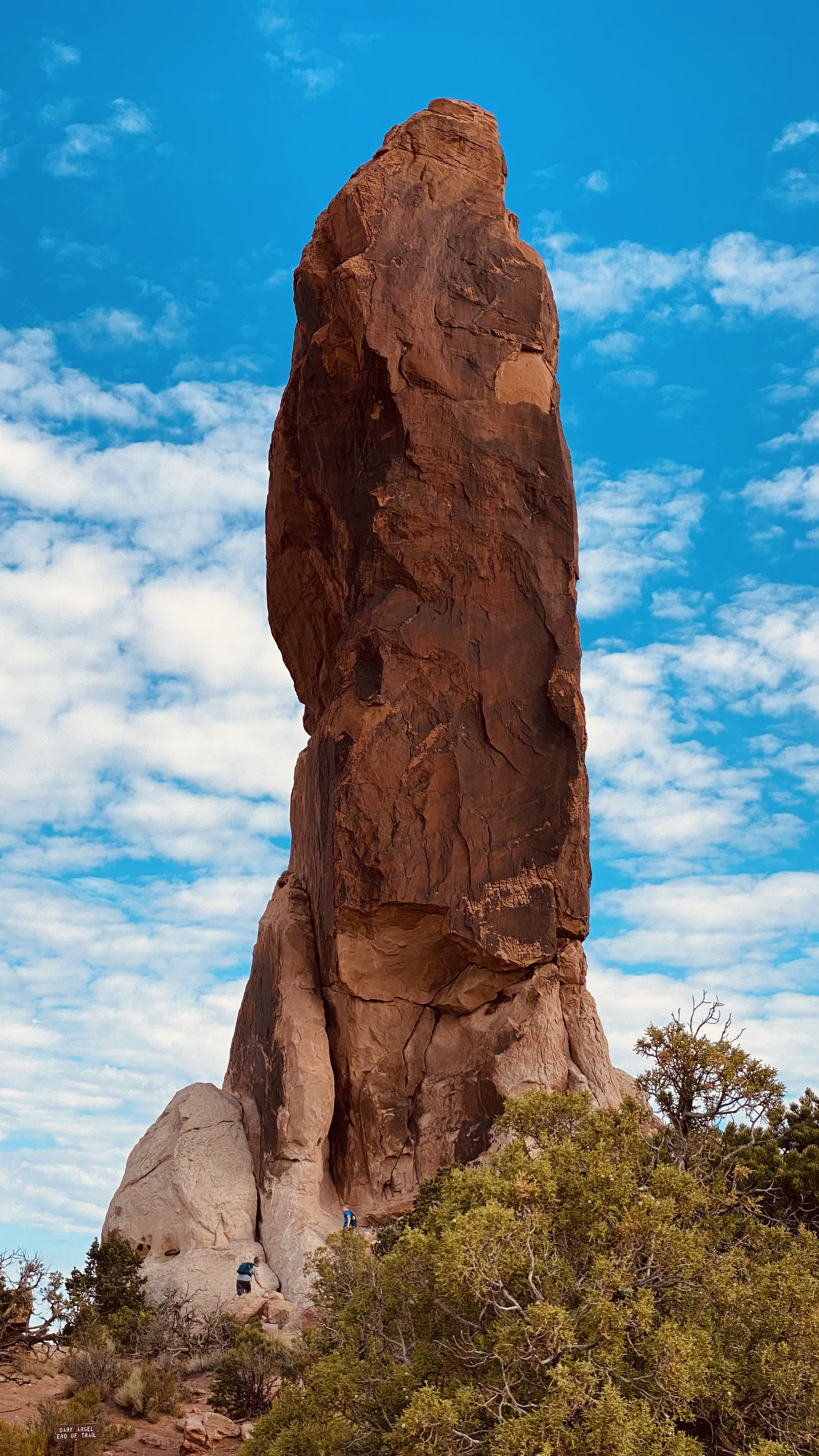
Dark Angel

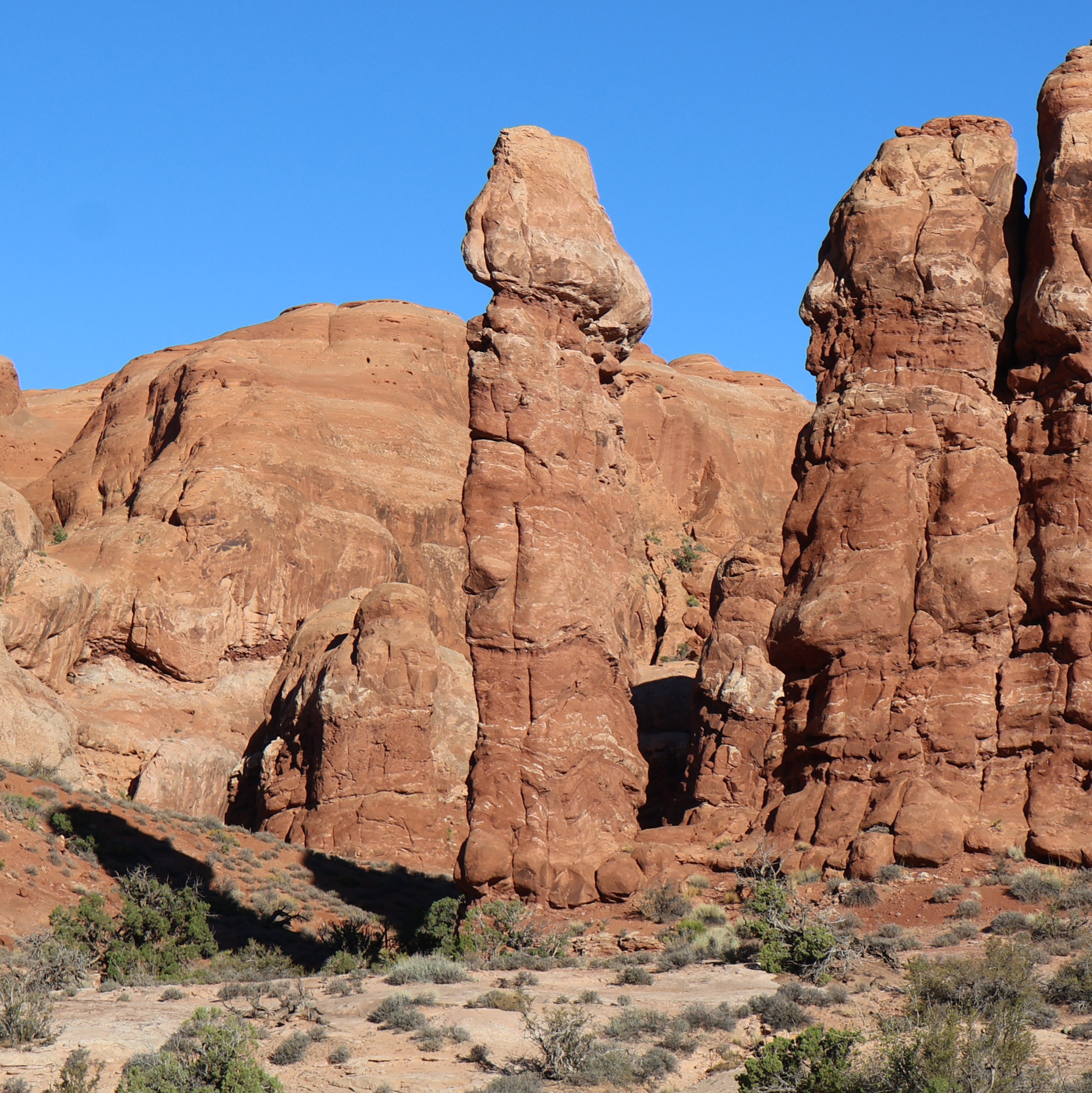
The Phallus

== See also ==
- List of national parks of the United States
- National Register of Historic Places listings in Arches National Park
- Natural Bridges National Monument - three natural bridges formed by flowing water
- Rainbow Bridge National Monument - the largest natural bridge in the Western Hemisphere
