= Petrified Dunes =

Coordinates: 38°40′20″N 109°34′49″W

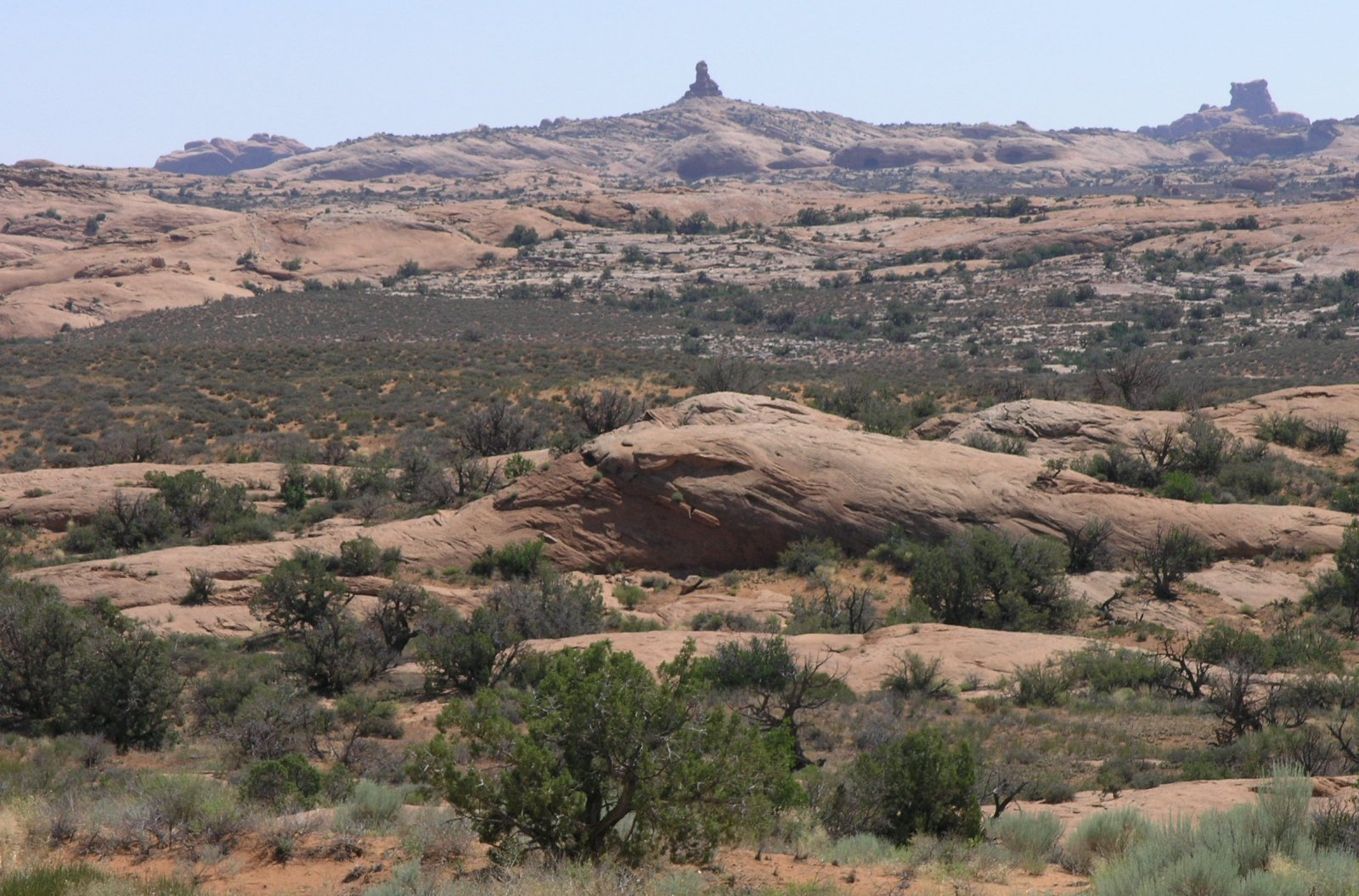
A view of the Petrified Dunes in Arches National Park, June 2005

Petrified dunes are rock formations located in several locations of the American south west, including Arches National Park, Zion National Park, and Snow Canyon State Park in southern Utah, United States. The formations were produced when ancient sand dunes hardened into stone under the overlying subsequent material, which later eroded away.
