= The Phallus =

Rock pillar in Grand County, Utah, US

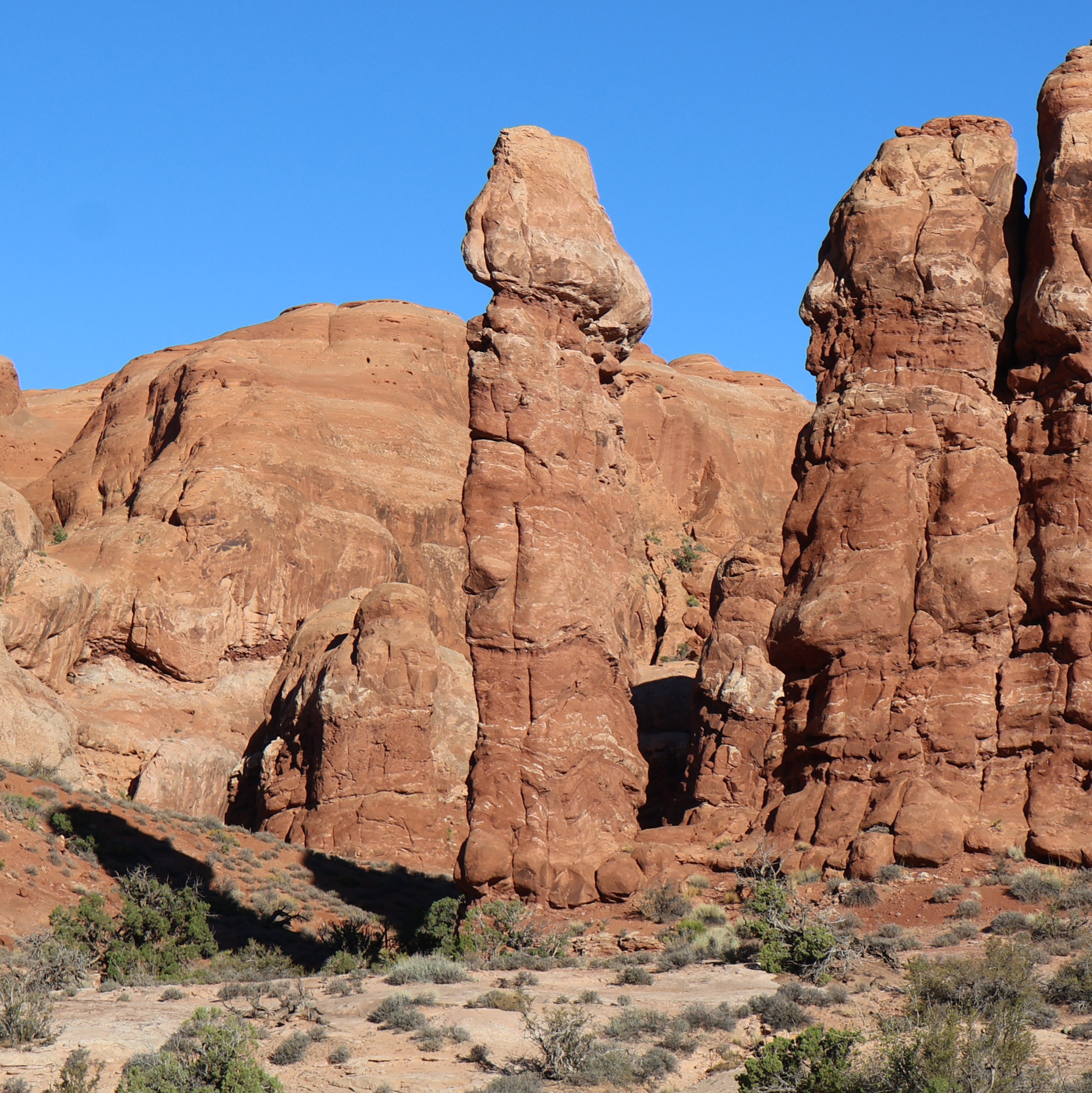
- View of the formation

- Location within Utah
- Location: Arches National Park, Utah
- Coordinates: 38.6830°N 109.5846°W
- Governing body: National Park Service

The Phallus is a rock formation (pillar) in Grand County, Utah, in the United States. It is within the Arches National Park.

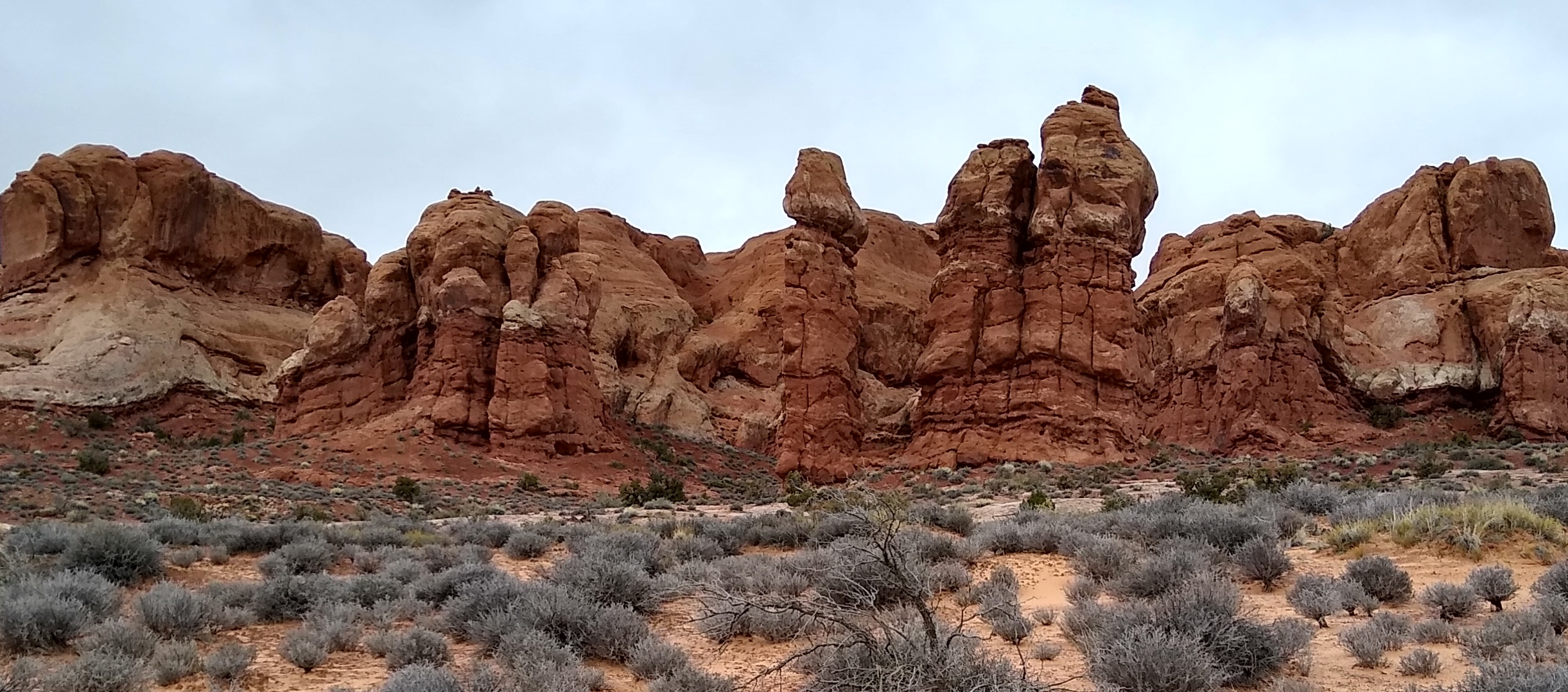
The Phallus and surrounding rocks

The Phallus stands 100 feet (30 m) tall, and was named from the fact it resembles a phallus. A climbing route has been published in guidebooks.

== See also ==
- Yang Yuan Stone
- Phallic Rock
