= Dark Angel (Utah) =

Freestanding pillar in Arches National Park

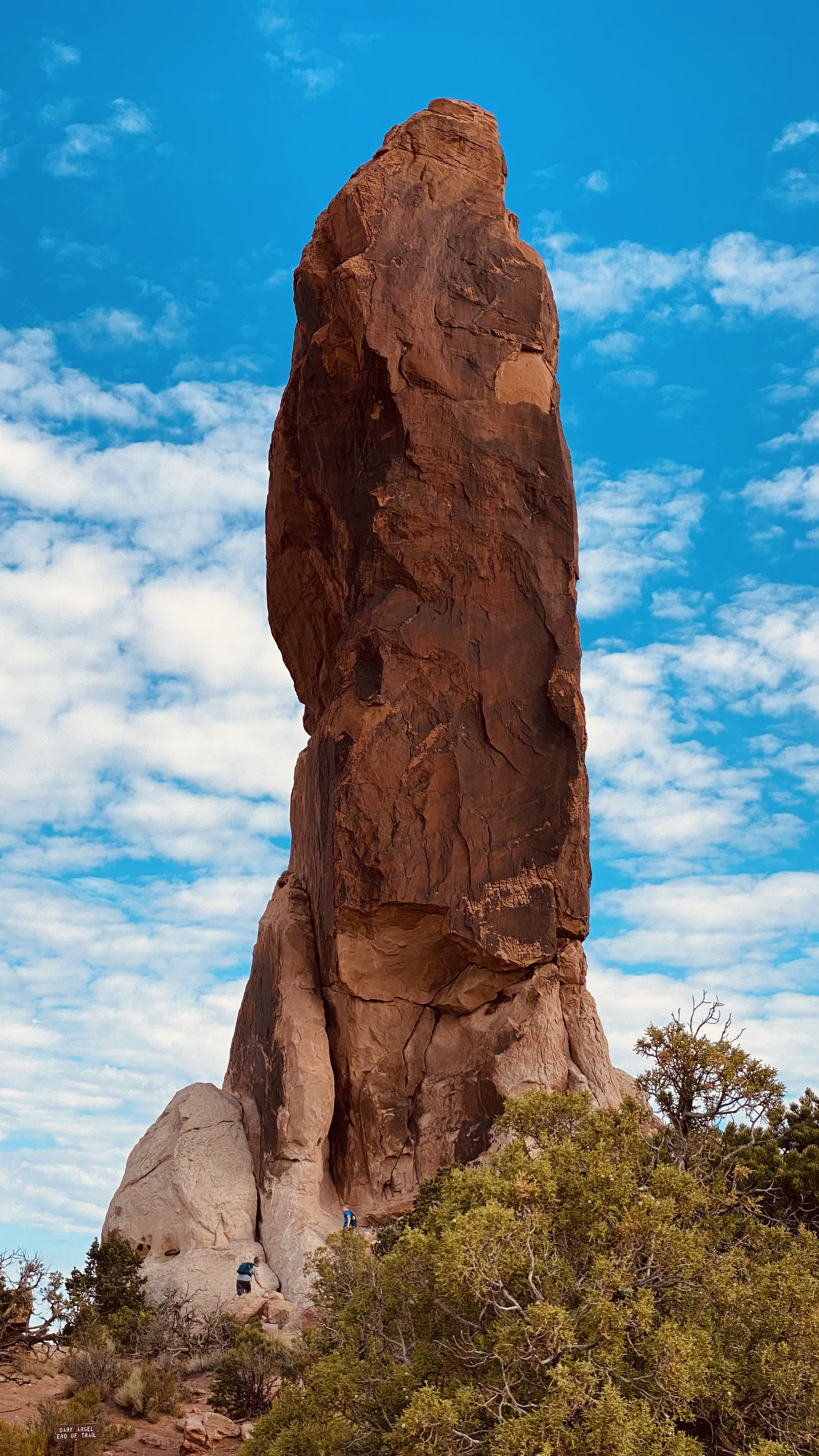
- View of the formation

- Location within Utah
- Location: Arches National Park, Utah, United States
- Nearest city: Moab
- Coordinates: 38.801434°N 109.627466°W
- Elevation: 150 ft (46 m)
- Governing body: National Park Service

Dark Angel is a natural sandstone rock formation in Arches National Park, Utah. The formation rises 150 feet (45 m) above the salt valley and was named after the dark colored sandstone that makes up the pillar.

== History ==
About 10,000 years ago, the Ancestral Pueblo and Fremont culture settled in the region known today as the Four Corners, cultivating certain plants such as Yucca. Around 700 years ago, in part due to climate change and colonization, the Fremont people began to migrate away from the region, followed afterwards with the Pueblo. Petroglyphs left by the culture can still be seen at the base of the formation.

== Access ==
The formation can be accessed via a 2.34 mile hike by the Dark Angel Trail. The path leaves from the end of the Devil's Garden Trail at a junction just south of Double O Arch. The pillar is also accessible by climbing, and was one of the first formations to be climbed in the park
