= Skyline Arch =

Natural rock arch in Moab, Utah, US

- Rock arch
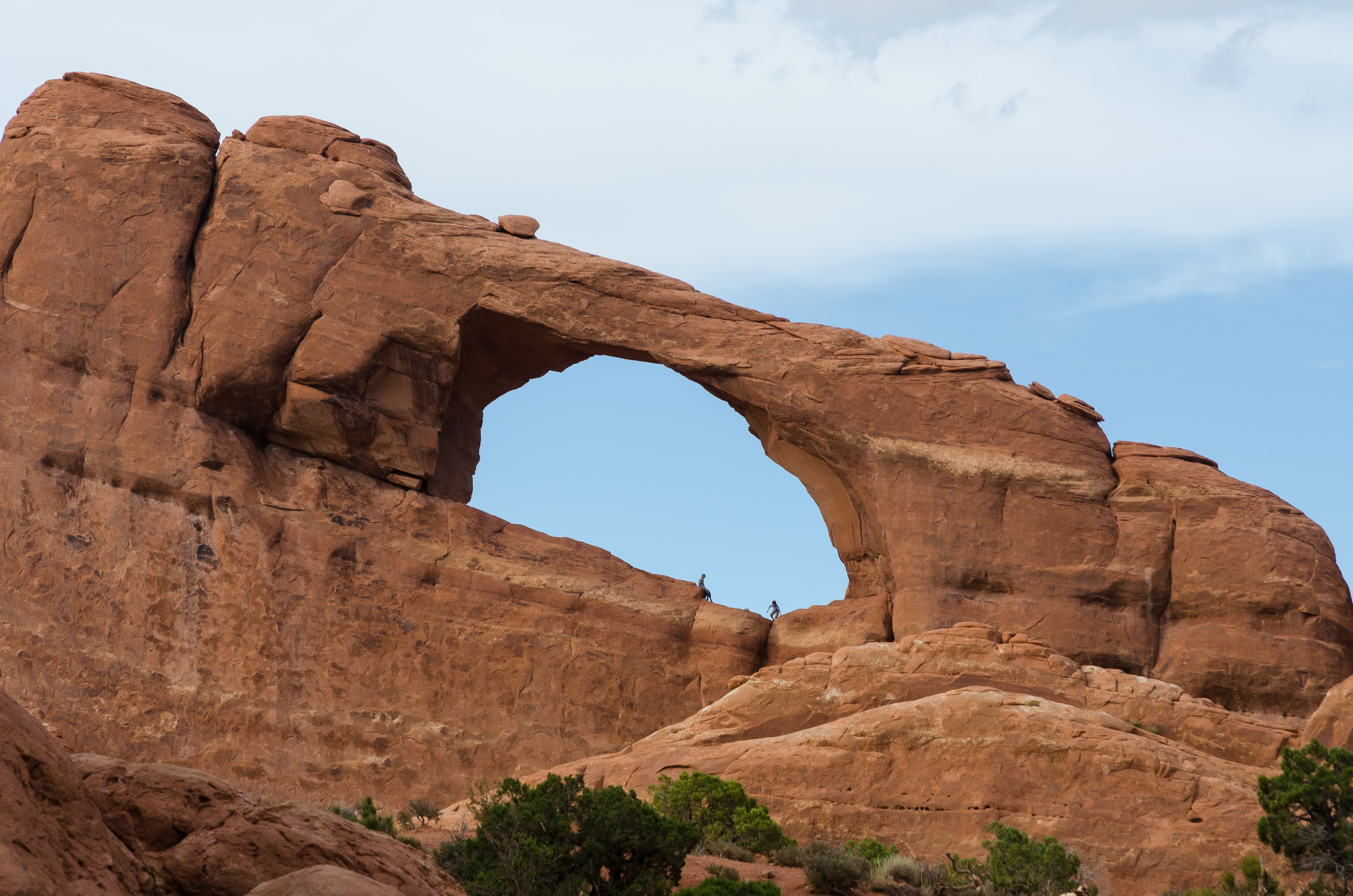
- View of the arch

- Location in Utah Location in Utah
- Coordinates: 38°46′28″N 109°35′24″W
- Location: Moab, Utah, United States

Dimensions
  - Length: 33 ft (10 m)
  - Height: 77 ft (23 m)
- Elevation: 5,243 ft (1,598 m)

Skyline Arch is a large natural arch located in Arches National Park near Moab, Utah, named because of its positioning on the horizon. The arch itself is one of the more popular landmarks in Arches National Park, visible from many areas of the park. A large boulder fell out of Skyline Arch in 1940, increasing the size of the opening by roughly half. Boulders from the collapse remain, and can be seen below the arch today.

== Access ==
Although the arch can be seen from the trailhead, it can be accessed via a short 0.4 mile one-way trail. While the elevation is mostly level, steps at the beginning make it inaccessible to wheelchairs.
