= Pine Tree Arch =

Natural rock arch in Utah, US

- Rock arch
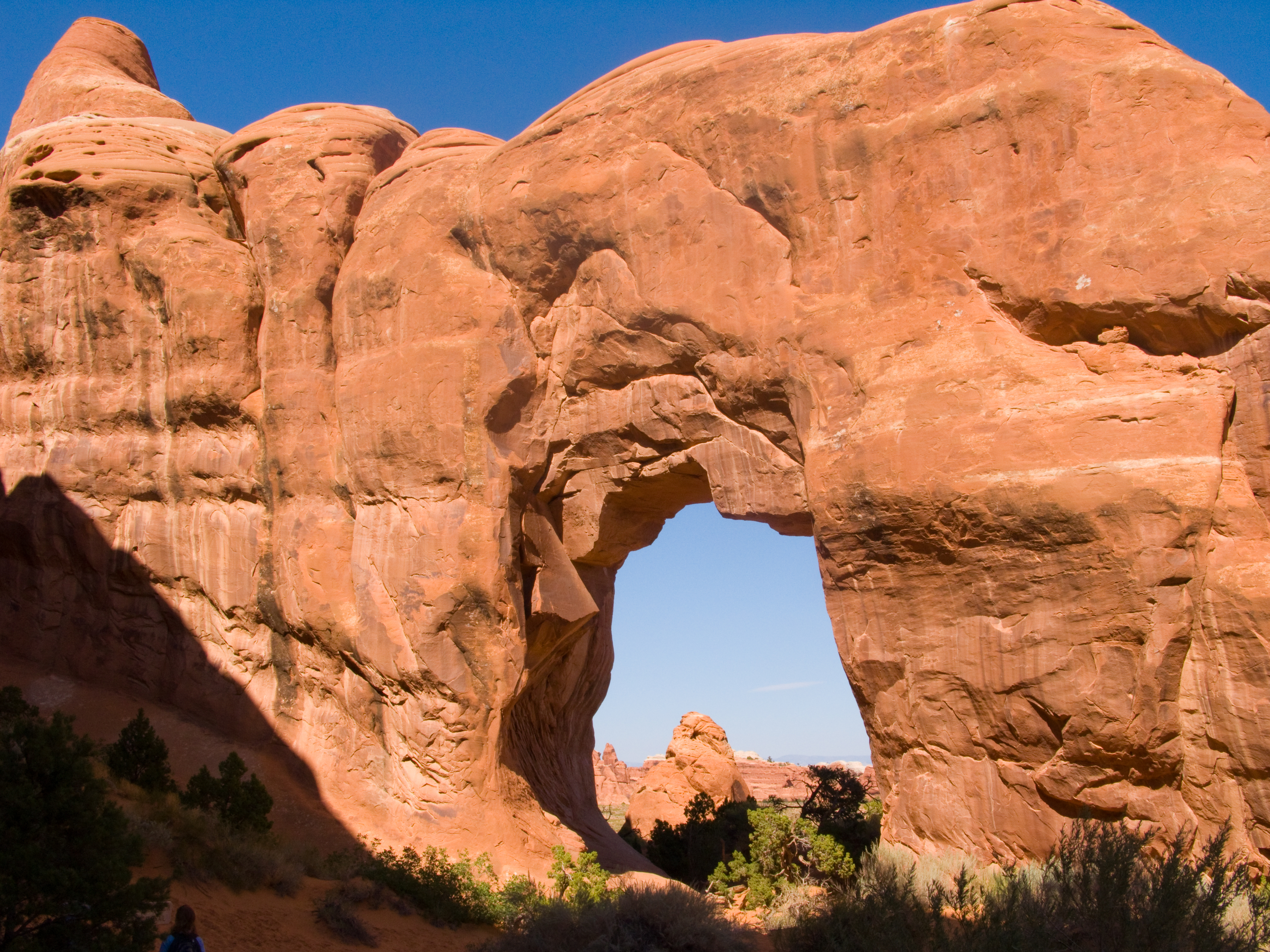
- View of the arch

- Location in Utah
- Coordinates: 38°47′15″N 109°35′54″W
- Location: Arches National Park, Utah

Dimensions
  - Length: 148 ft (45 m)
- Elevation: 5,204 ft (1,586 m)

Pine Tree Arch is a large natural sandstone arch located in the Devil's Garden area of Arches National Park near Moab, Utah. The arch measures 149 feet in span.

== Name ==
Pine Tree Arch is named after the various pine trees that can be seen under and around the formation.

== Access ==
The arch can be accessed from the Devil's Garden Trailhead, approximately 18 miles from the park entrance. The trail is relatively flat and stops by Tunnel Arch and the much larger Landscape Arch.
