= Delicate Arch =

Freestanding natural arch

- Rock arch
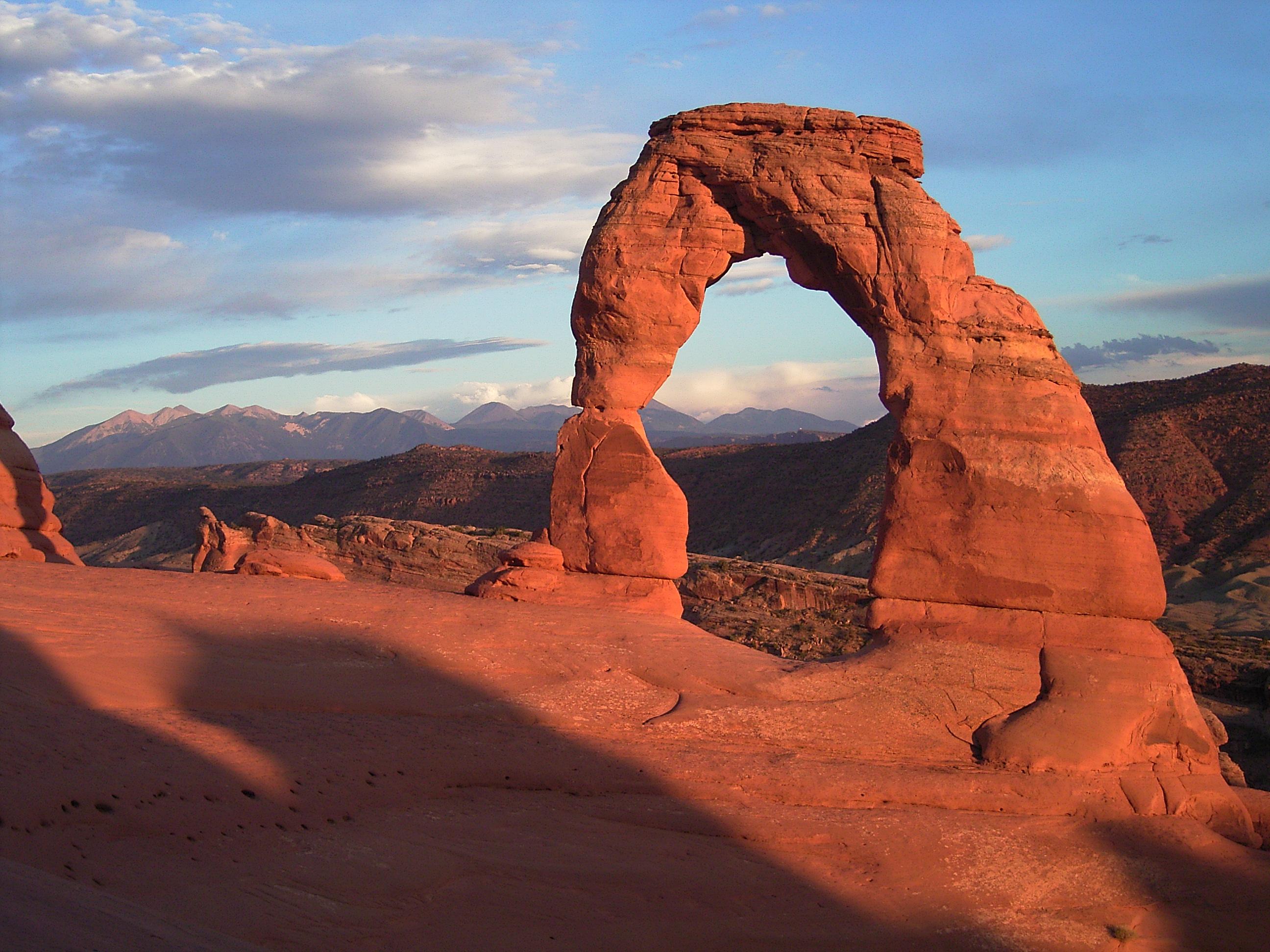
- View of the Delicate Arch, August 2005

- Location within Utah Location within the United States
- Coordinates: 38°44′37″N 109°29′58″W
- Location: Arches National Park, Utah, United States

Dimensions
  - Height: 52 ft (16 m)
- Elevation: 4,606 ft (1,404 m)

Delicate Arch is a 52-foot-tall (16 m) freestanding natural arch located in Arches National Park, near Moab in Grand County, Utah, United States. The arch is the most widely recognized landmark in Arches National Park and is depicted on Utah license plates and a postage stamp commemorating Utah's centennial anniversary of admission to the Union in 1896. The Olympic torch relay for the 2002 Winter Olympics passed through the arch.

== History ==
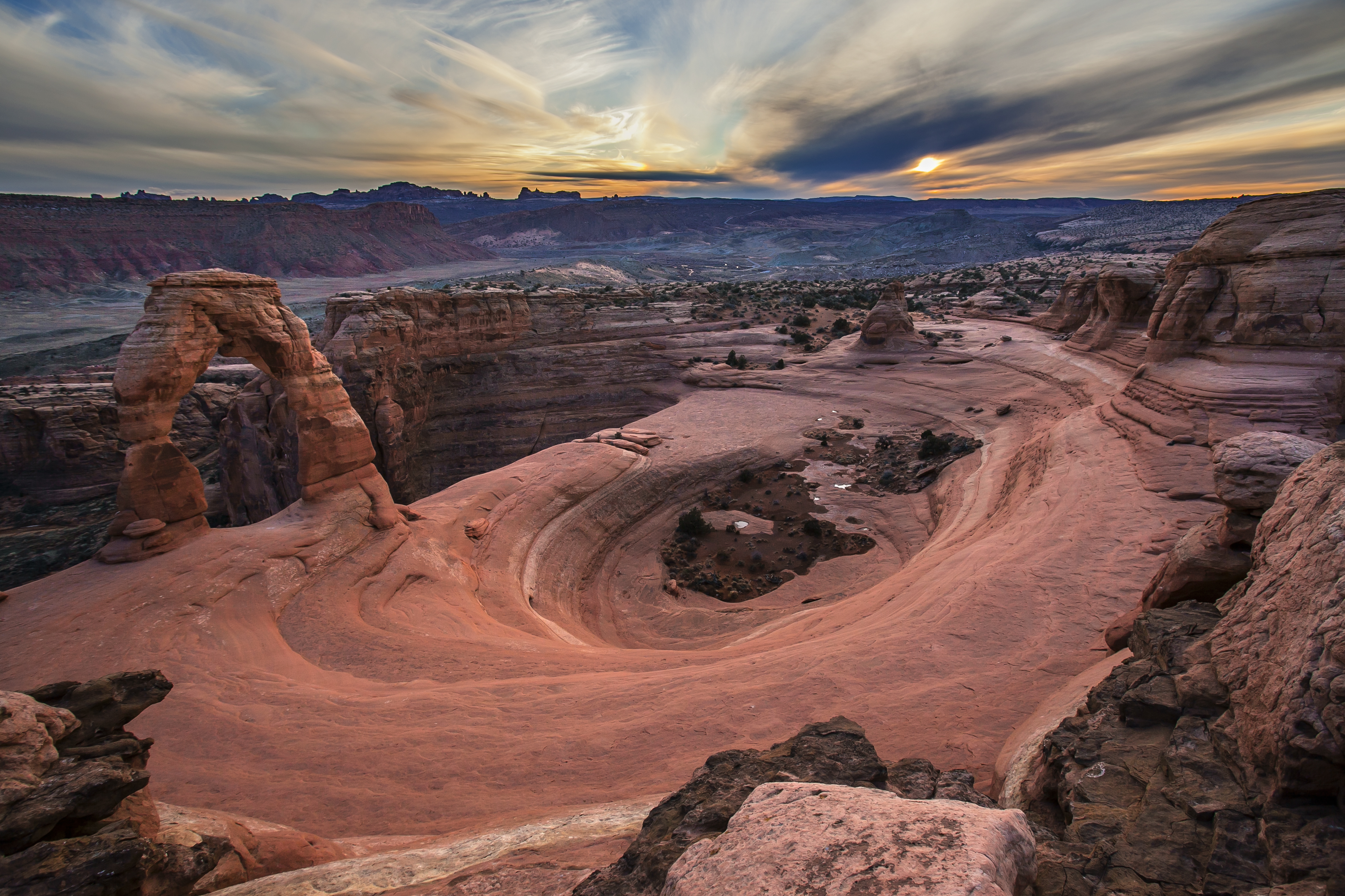
Delicate Arch and adjacent large panhole at sunset, February 2011

Because of its distinctive shape, the arch was known as "the Chaps" and "the Schoolmarm's Bloomers" by local cowboys. Many other names have been applied to this arch including "Bloomers Arch", "Marys Bloomers", "Old Maids Bloomers", "Pants Crotch", "Salt Wash Arch", and "School Marms Pants". The arch was given its current name by Frank Beckwith, leader of the Arches National Monument Scientific Expedition, who explored the area in the winter of 1933–1934. Although there is a rumor that the names of Delicate Arch and Landscape Arch were inadvertently exchanged due to a signage mixup by the National Park Service (NPS), this is false.

This arch played no part in the original designation of the area as a national monument (Arches National Monument) in 1929 and was not included within the original boundaries. It was added when the monument was enlarged in 1938.

In the 1950s, the NPS investigated the possibility of applying a clear plastic coating to the arch to protect it from further erosion and eventual destruction. The idea was ultimately abandoned as impractical and contrary to NPS principles.

Nature photographer Michael Fatali started a fire under the arch in September 2000 to demonstrate nighttime photography techniques to a group of amateur photographers. The fire discolored portions of the sandstone near the arch. Fatali was placed on probation and fined $10,900 in restitution to the NPS for the cost of cleanup efforts.

In 2017, the United Utah Party was founded, and chose Delicate Arch as its official party logo.

== Geology ==
Delicate Arch is formed of Entrada Sandstone. The original sandstone fin was gradually worn away by weathering and erosion, leaving the arch. Other arches in the park were formed the same way but, due to placement and less dramatic shape, are not as famous.

== Ecology ==
During the summer, white-throated swifts (Aeronautes saxatalis) nest in the top of the arch.

== Climbing ==
In May 2006, climber Dean Potter performed as many as six free solo ascents of the arch. Climbing Delicate Arch was not explicitly forbidden under the rules in force at the time, which only stated that routes "may be closed" on any named arch; however, most climbers accepted that the named arch formations should not be climbed. The NPS has since closed the loophole by disallowing climbs on any named arch within the park year-round. Slacklining and the placement of new fixed anchors on new climbs are also prohibited.

Controversy ensued when photographs taken after Potter's climb appeared to show damage caused by a climbing technique called top roping. Potter stated on several occasions that he never damaged the arch, and no photos exist of Potter using a top rope setup on the arch. Previous climbers may have top-roped the arch, leaving the existing rope scars. Potter did admit to using a counterweighted rope over the top of the arch, within a natural groove, as well as four cams in a horizontal crack of harder rock at the summit. He used the rope and cams for protection while rehearsing his free solo route and to rappel back down after the free solos. Two fellow climbers also ascended via fixed ropes, one of whom recorded video of Potter from the top.

== Tourism ==
Delicate Arch is one of the main tourist draws in Arches National Park. The parking lot at the Delicate Arch Trailhead, although large, fills up quickly on most days. The trail to Delicate Arch is 3 miles (4.8 kilometers) round trip with an elevation change of 480 feet (146 meters). The trail is well defined for the first 1/2 mile, then does a steep incline over open rock. There is a narrow ledge for the last 200 yards (183 meter) before reaching the arch.
