= Sheep Rock (Arches National Park) =

Pillar in Utah, United States

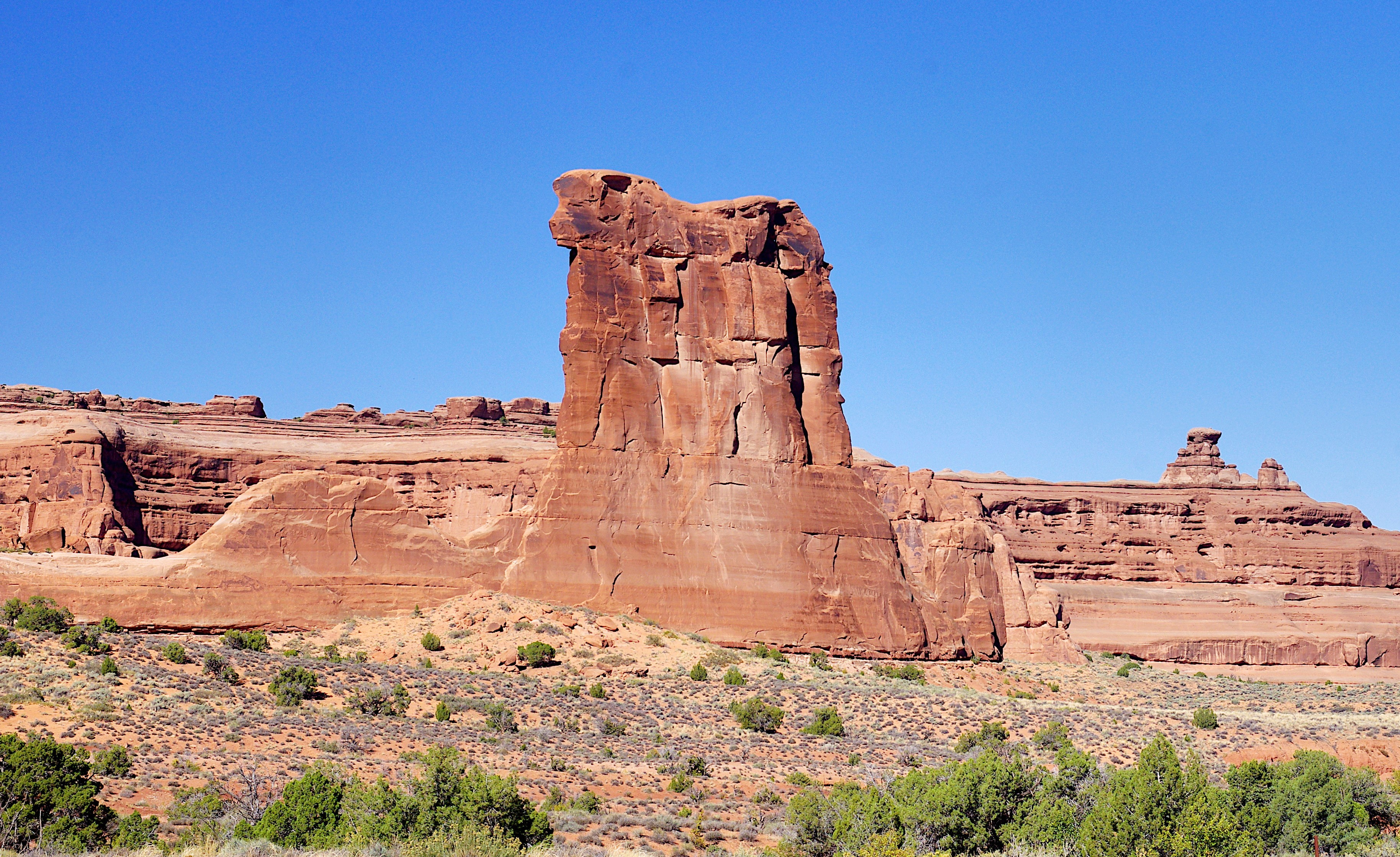
- East aspect

Highest point
- Elevation: 4,564 ft (1,391 m)
- Prominence: 254 ft (77 m)
- Parent peak: Tower of Babel (4,655 ft)
- Isolation: 0.20 mi (0.32 km)
- Coordinates: 38°38′22″N 109°36′22″W

Geography
- Location within Utah Location within the United States
- Country: United States
- State: Utah
- County: Grand
- Protected area: Arches National Park
- Parent range: Colorado Plateau
- Topo map: USGS The Windows Section

Geology
- Rock age: Jurassic
- Mountain type: Butte
- Rock type: Entrada Sandstone

Climbing
- First ascent: 1986
- Easiest route: class 5.8 climbing

Sheep Rock is a 4,564-foot-elevation (1,391-meter) pillar in Grand County, Utah. It is located within Arches National Park and like many of the rock formations in the park, it is composed of Entrada Sandstone, specifically the Slick Rock Member overlaying the Dewey Bridge Member. The tower is 440 feet tall, and is approximately 0.15 mile (0.24 km) from the main park road. Sheep Rock is believed to be a remnant abutment of an ancient fallen arch. Precipitation runoff from Sheep Rock drains to the nearby Colorado River via Courthouse Wash. This landform's descriptive toponym has been officially adopted by the United States Board on Geographic Names.

== Climbing ==
The first ascent of the summit was made October 2, 1986, by Charlie Fowler and Kyle Copeland via the class 5.9 Buggers Banquet route on the west face. Another route is the class 5.8 Virgin Wool, first climbed in November 1986 by Jim Bodenhamer and Sandy Fleming.

== Climate ==
According to the Köppen climate classification system, Sheep Rock is located in a cold semi-arid climate zone with cold winters and hot summers. Spring and fall are the most favorable seasons to experience Arches National Park, when highs average 60 to 80 °F (15 to 25 °C) and lows average 30 to 50 °F (0 to 10 °C). Summer temperatures often exceed 100 °F (40 °C). Winters are cold, with highs averaging 30 to 50 °F (0 to 10 °C), and lows averaging 0 to 20 °F (−20 to −5 °C). As part of a high desert region, it can experience wide daily temperature fluctuations. The park receives an average of less than 10 inches (25 cm) of rain annually.

== See also ==
- Geology of Utah

== Gallery ==
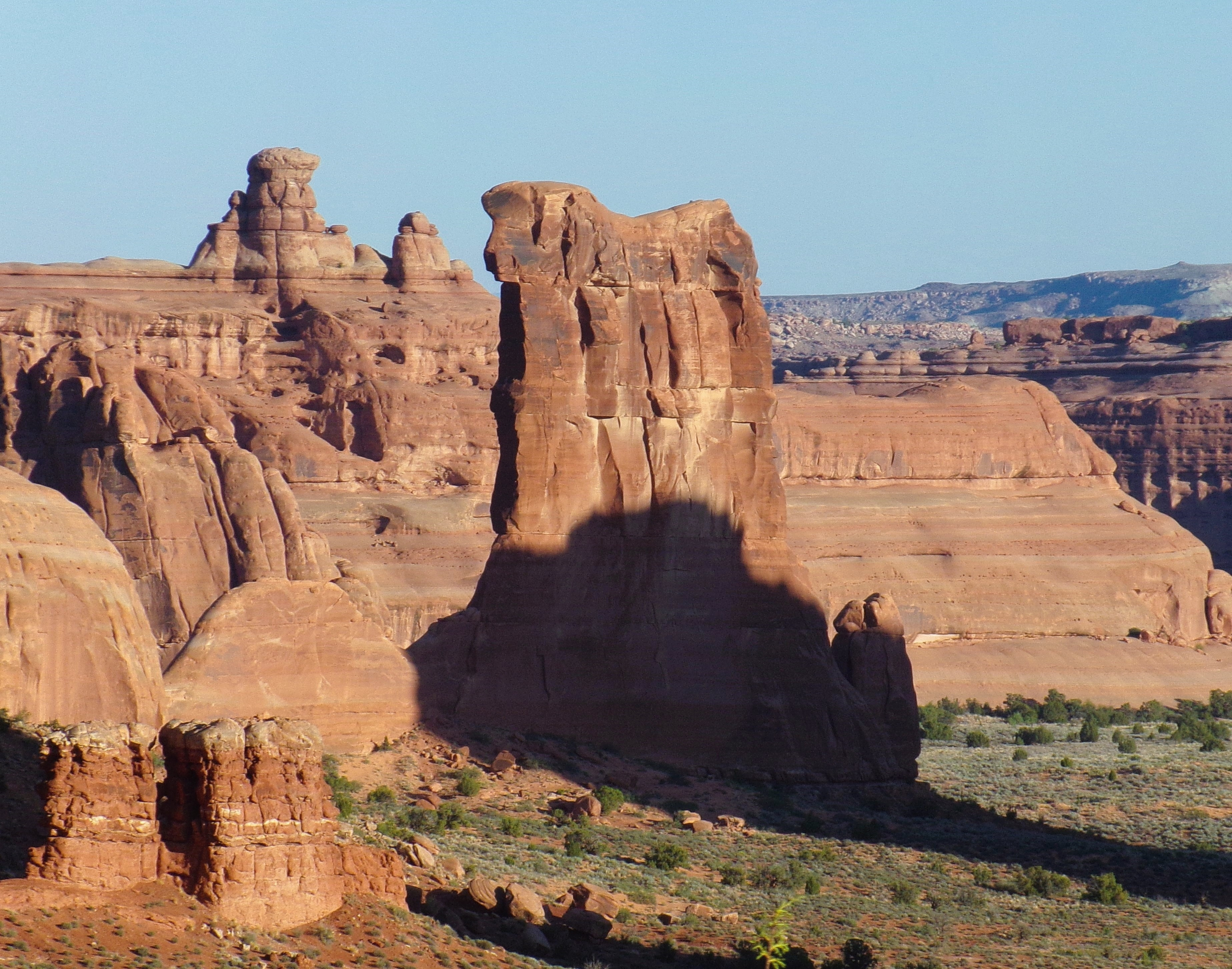
Sheep Rock in morning light from southeast

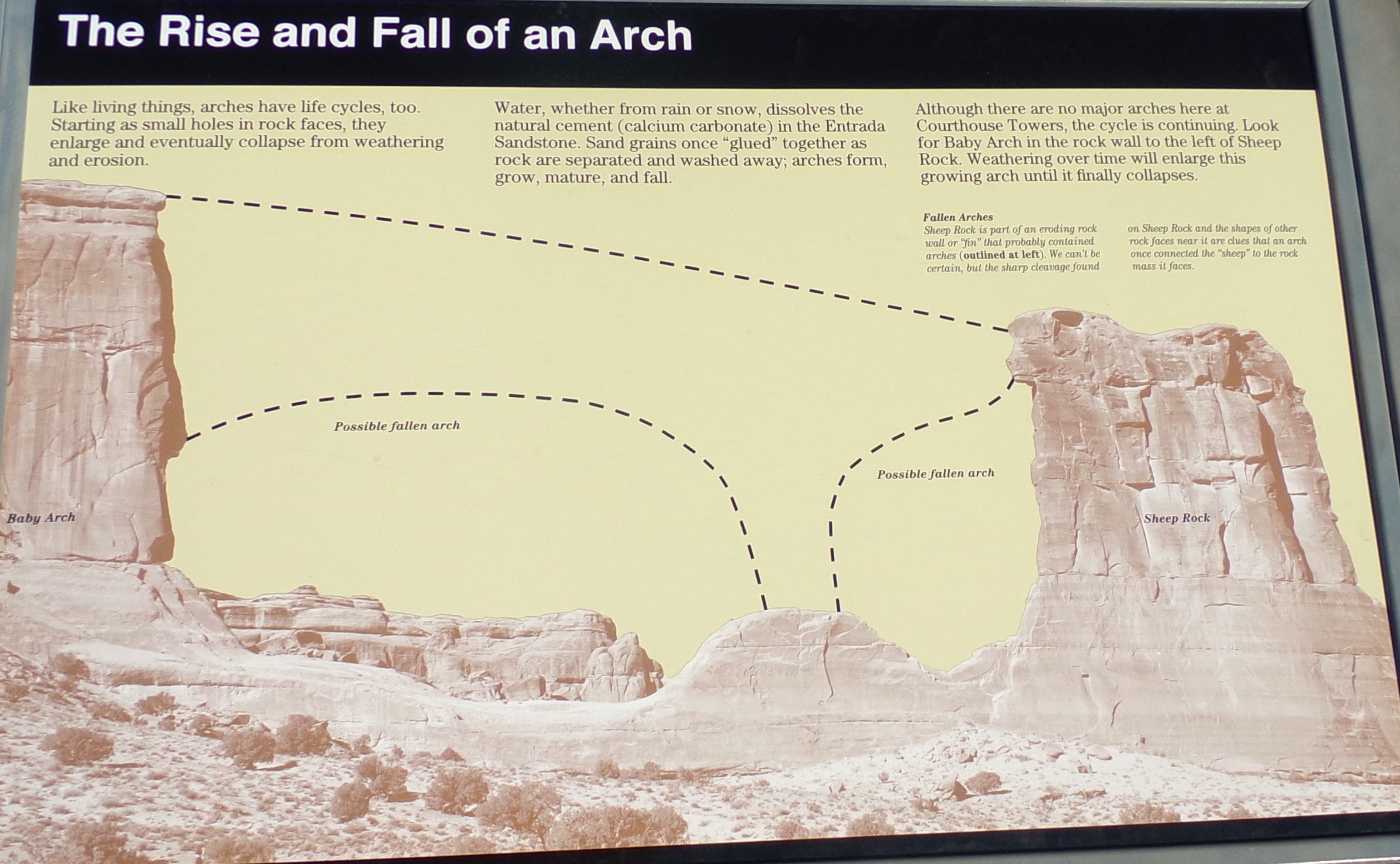
Park roadside interpretive sign showing Sheep Rock and fallen arch possibility

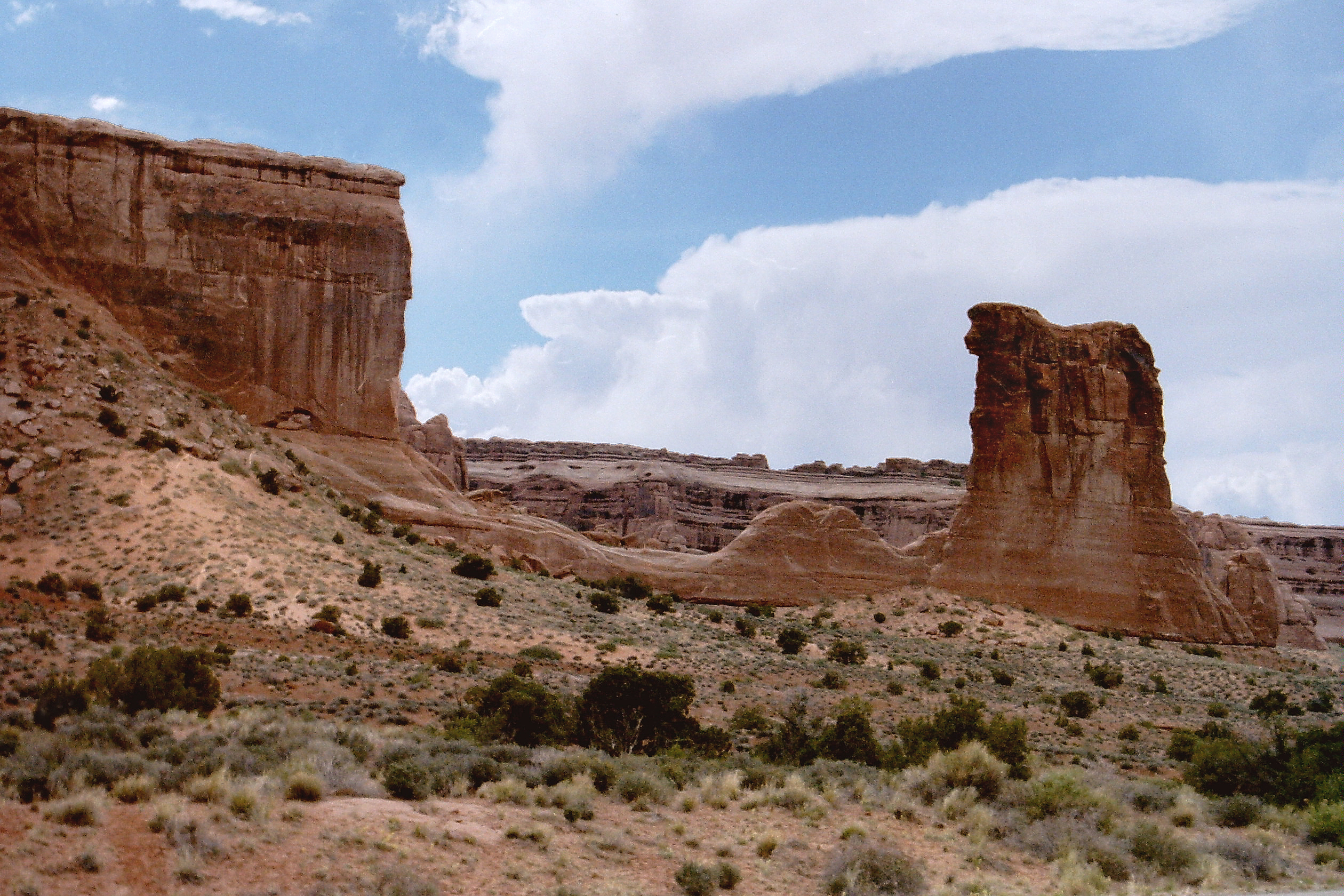
Sheep Rock (right) with void of collapsed arch

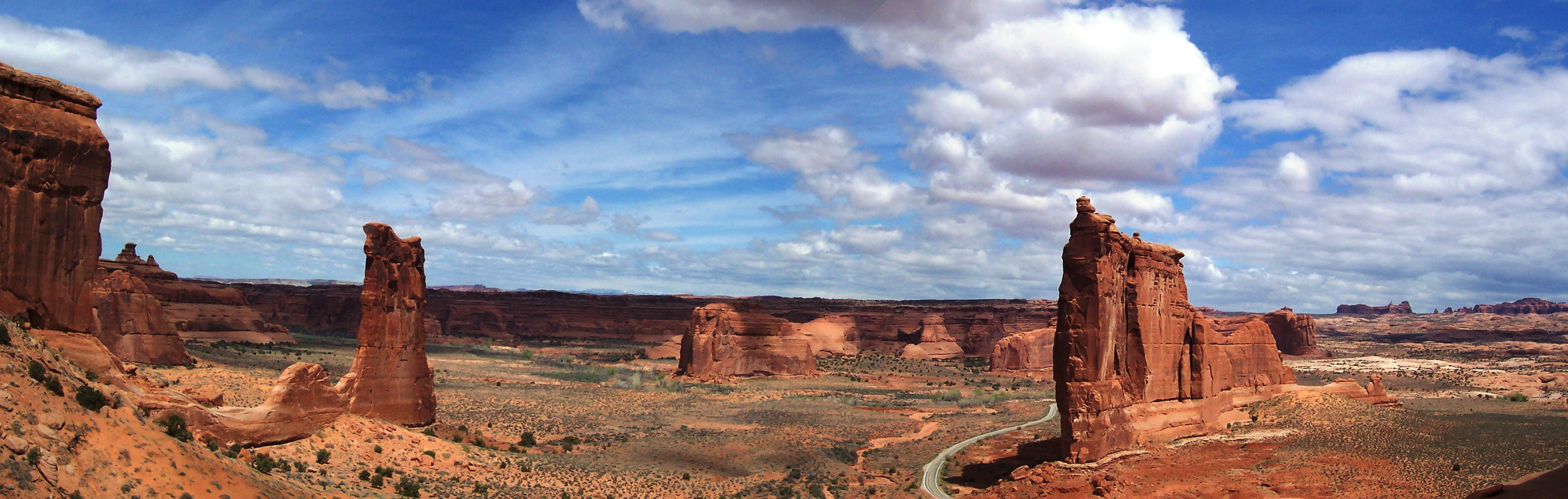
Sheep Rock (left) and Tower of Babel (right) from south

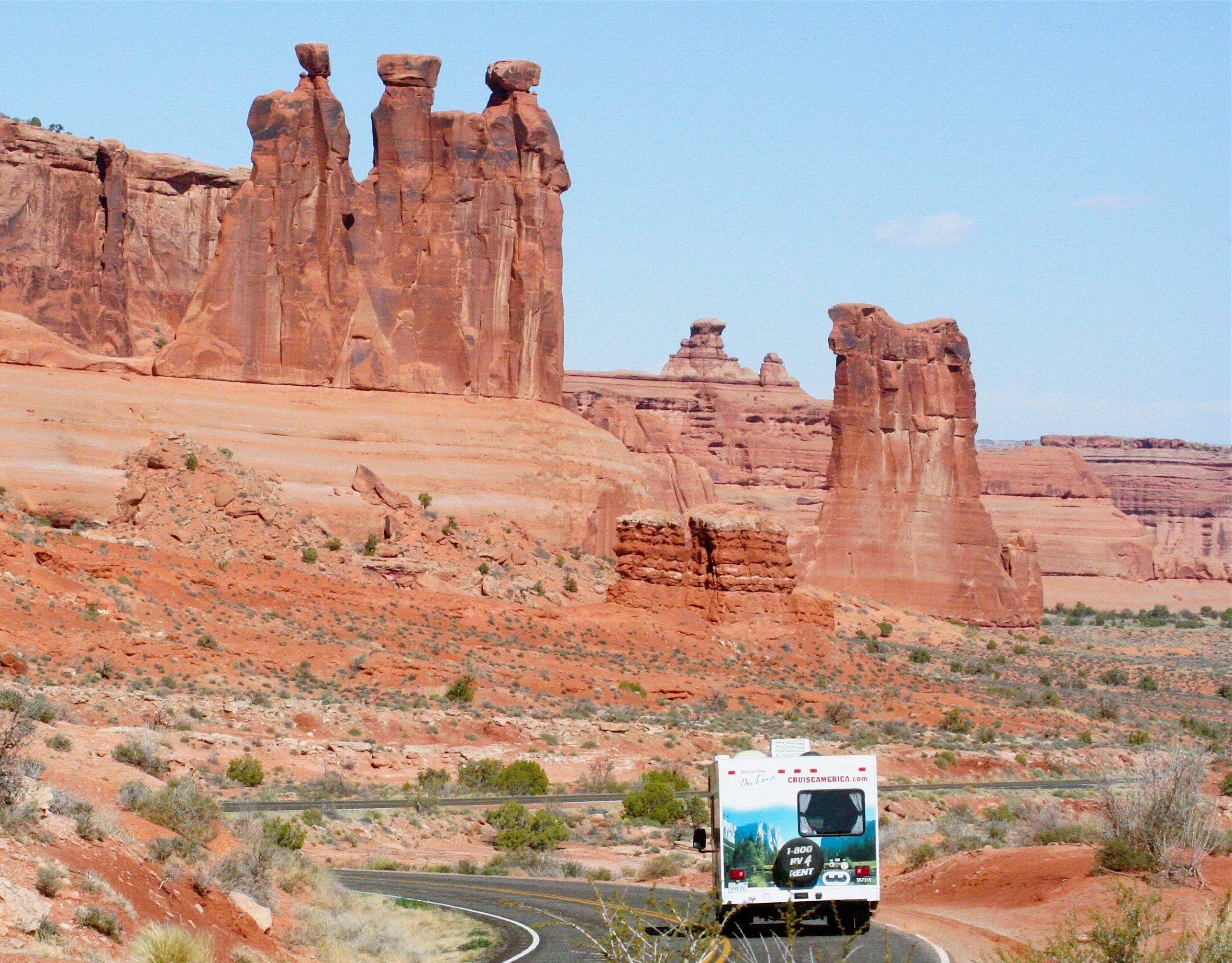
Three Gossips (upper left) and Sheep Rock (right) from the main road
