= The Candelabrum =

Sandstone pillar rock formation in Utah, United States

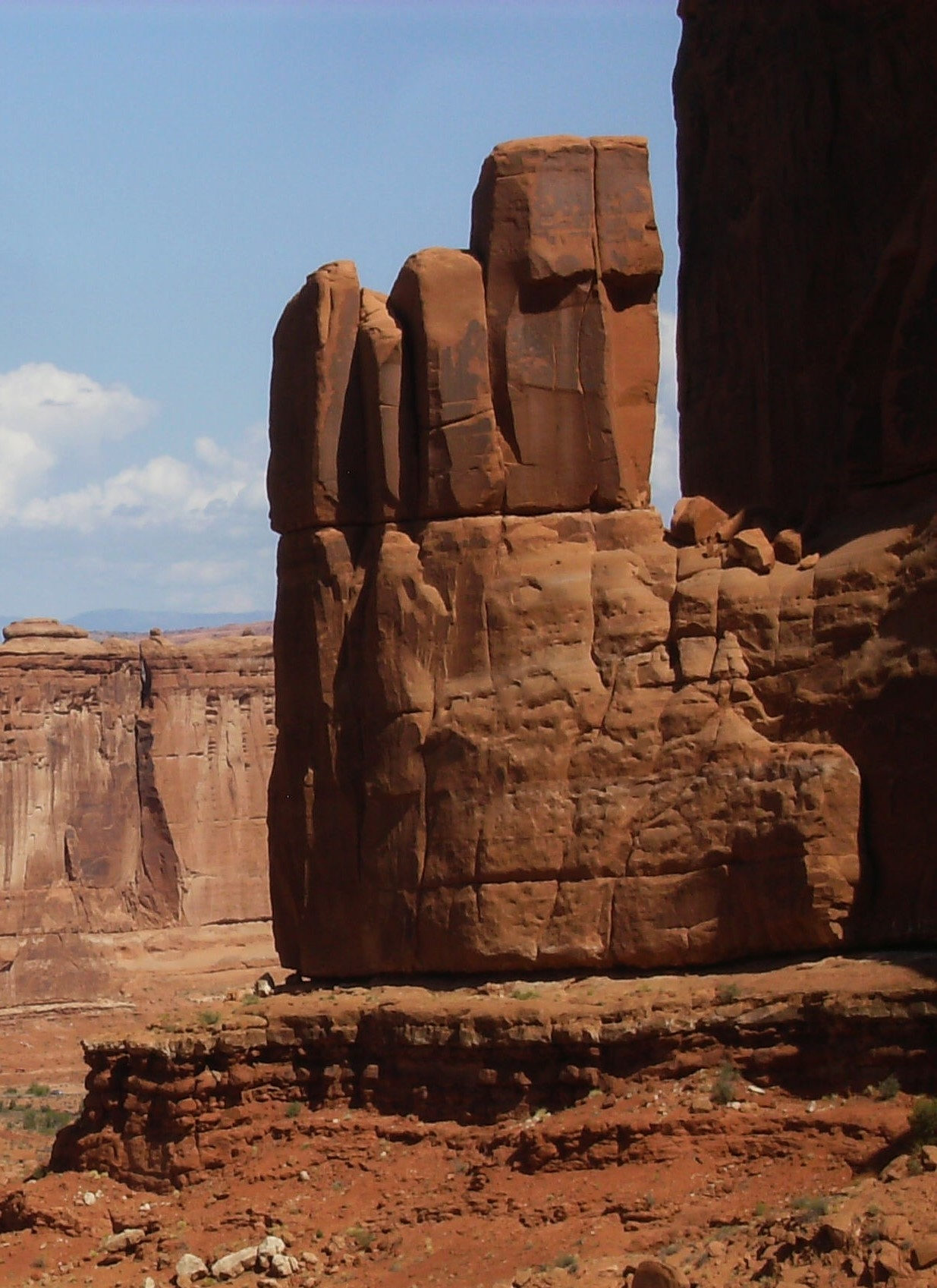
- South aspect

Highest point
- Elevation: 4,700 ft (1,433 m)
- Prominence: 80 ft (24 m)
- Isolation: 0.31 mi (0.50 km)
- Coordinates: 38°37′44″N 109°36′00″W

Naming
- Etymology: Candelabrum

Geography
- Location within Utah Location within the United States
- Country: United States
- State: Utah
- County: Grand
- Protected area: Arches National Park
- Parent range: Colorado Plateau
- Topo map: USGS The Windows Section

Geology
- Rock age: Jurassic
- Rock type: Entrada Sandstone

Climbing
- First ascent: 1986
- Easiest route: class 5.9 A2

The Candelabrum is a 4,700-foot-elevation (1,433-meter) pillar in Grand County, Utah, United States.

== Description ==
The Candelabrum is located within the Park Avenue section of Arches National Park and like many of the rock formations in the park, it is composed of Entrada Sandstone, specifically the Slick Rock Member overlaying the Dewey Bridge Member. Topographic relief is significant as the summit rises 300 feet (91 meters) above the Park Avenue Trail in 300 feet (91 meters) laterally. Precipitation runoff from Candelabrum drains to the Colorado River via Courthouse Wash. The first ascent of the summit was made in November 1986 by Charlie Fowler and Chris Goplerud via Play with Fire rock-climbing route. Kyle Copeland and Alison Sheets first climbed the class 5.11c A2 Hall of Flame route in 1986. This landform was shown briefly in the opening scene of the 1989 American action-adventure film Indiana Jones and the Last Crusade.

== Climate ==
According to the Köppen climate classification system, The Candelabrum is located in a cold semi-arid climate zone with cold winters and hot summers. Spring and fall are the most favorable seasons to experience Arches National Park, when highs average 60 to 80 °F (15 to 25 °C) and lows average 30 to 50 °F (0 to 10 °C). Summer temperatures often exceed 100 °F (40 °C). Winters are cold, with highs averaging 30 to 50 °F (0 to 10 °C), and lows averaging 0 to 20 °F (−20 to −5 °C). As part of a high desert region, it can experience wide daily temperature fluctuations. The park receives an average of less than 10 inches (25 cm) of rain annually.

== Gallery ==
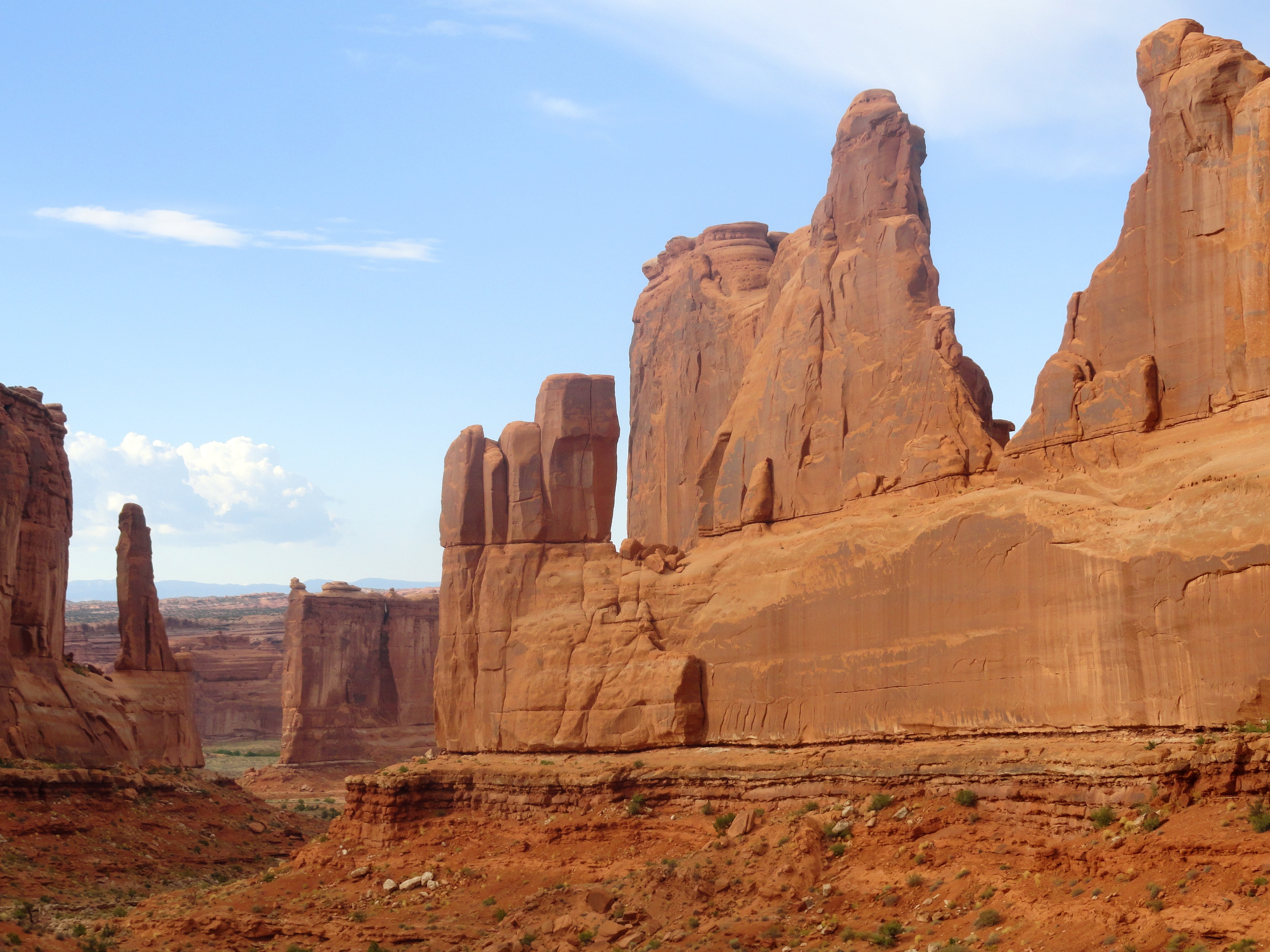
Candelabrum centered

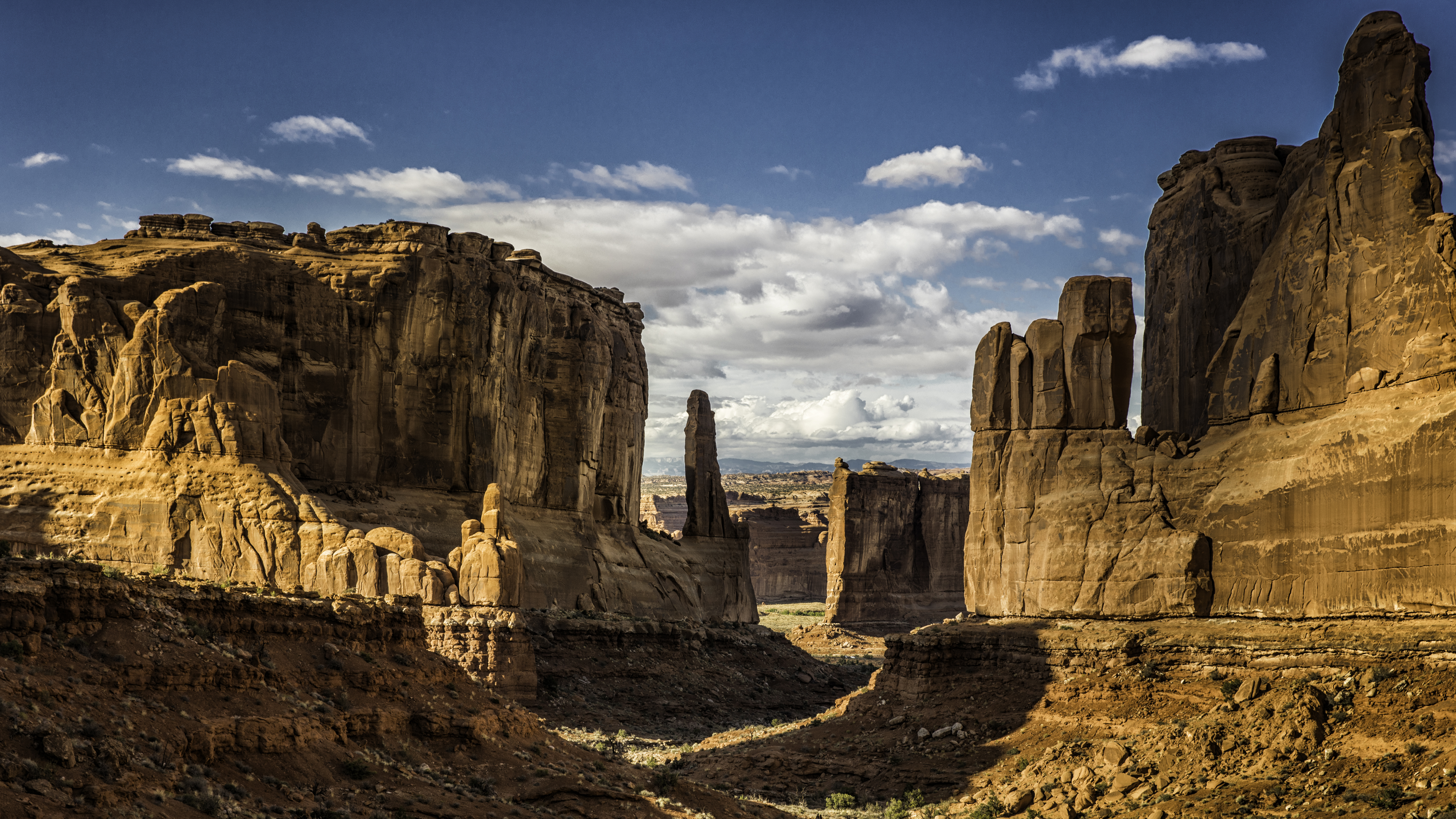
The view from Park Avenue Overlook. The Candelabrum to right.

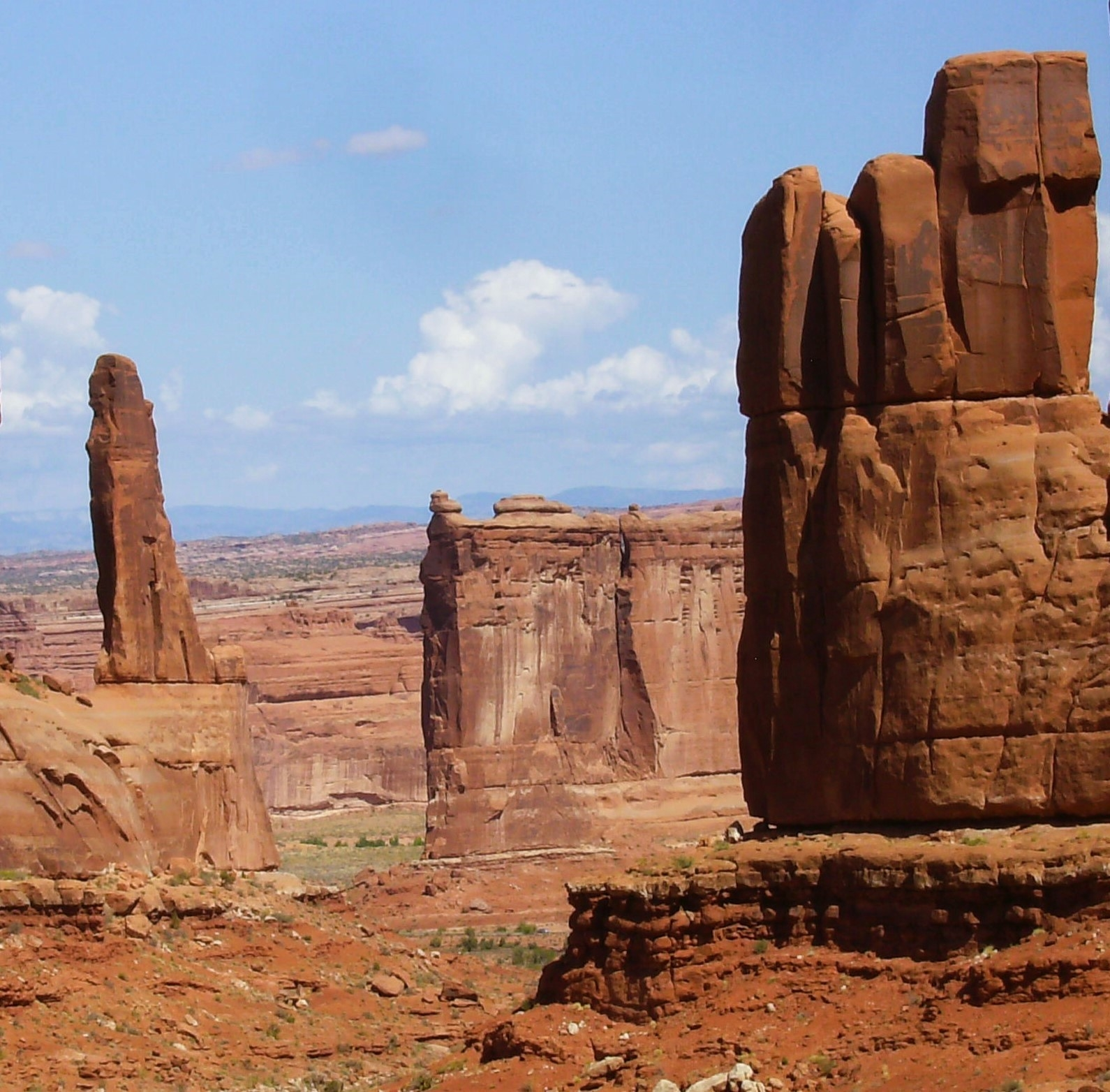
Argon Tower (left), Candelabrum to right.

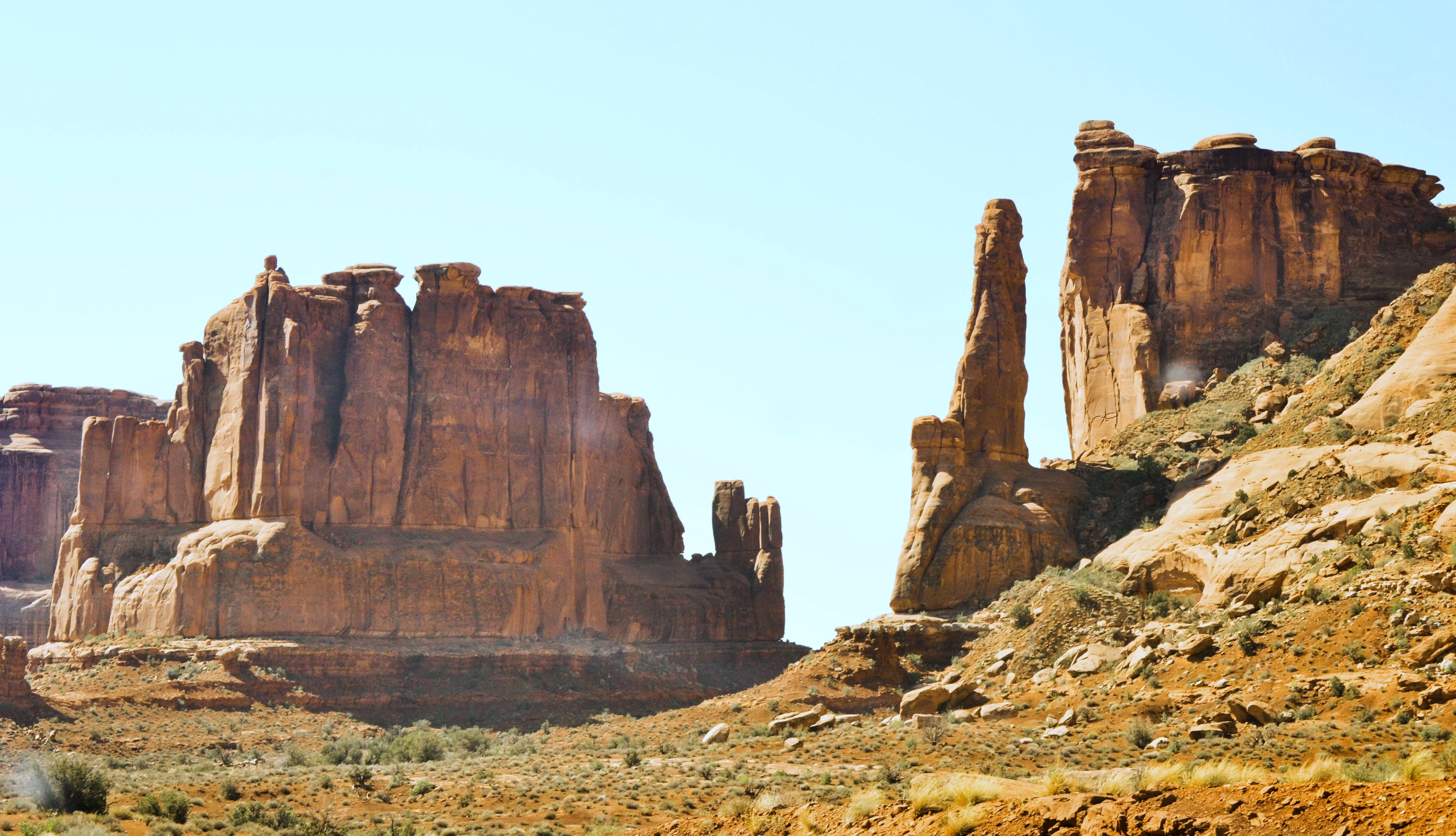
The Candelabrum (centered) viewed from the north, with Argon Tower to right

== See also ==
- Geology of Utah
