= Three Gossips =

Natural rock formation in Utah, US

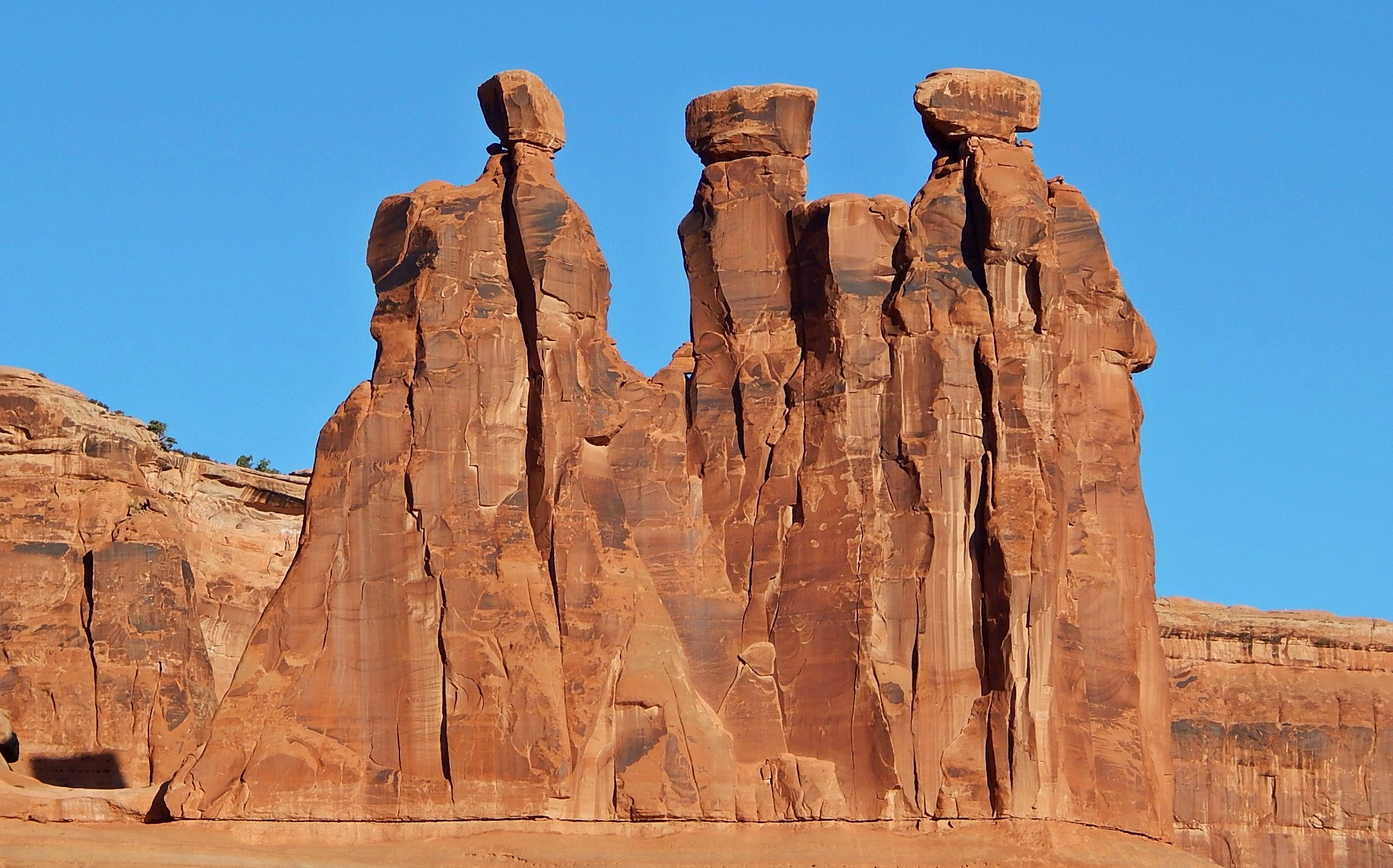
- East aspect

Highest point
- Elevation: 4,700 ft (1,433 m)
- Prominence: 240 ft (73 m)
- Parent peak: The Organ (4,735 ft)
- Isolation: 0.28 mi (0.45 km)
- Coordinates: 38°38′09″N 109°36′11″W

Geography
- Location within Utah Location within the United States
- Country: United States
- State: Utah
- County: Grand
- Protected area: Arches National Park
- Parent range: Colorado Plateau
- Topo map: USGS The Windows Section

Geology
- Rock age: Jurassic
- Rock type: Entrada Sandstone

Climbing
- First ascent: 1970
- Easiest route: class 5.7 climbing

The Three Gossips is a 4,700-foot-elevation (1,433-meter) sandstone pillar in Grand County, Utah, United States.

== Description ==
Three Gossips is located within Arches National Park and it is an iconic rock feature visible from the main park road at the Courthouse Towers area. Like many of the rock formations in the park, it is composed of Entrada Sandstone which formed between 180 and 140 million years ago. The tower is 350 feet tall, and topographic relief is significant as the summit rises 500 feet (152 meters) above surrounding terrain in 0.15 miles (0.24 km). Precipitation runoff from Three Gossips drains to the nearby Colorado River via Courthouse Wash. The pillars were named for the shape of the rock which resembles three heads talking amongst themselves. This landform's descriptive toponym has been officially adopted by the United States Board on Geographic Names. This landform was shown briefly in the opening scene credits of the 1989 American action adventure film Indiana Jones and the Last Crusade.

== Climbing ==
The first ascent of the summit was made in October 1970 by Allen Steck and Steve Roper via the class 5.11 West Face.

Other rock-climbing routes on Three Gossips:

- Lyon Trautner Route - class 5.10 - Charles Lyon, Todd Trautner - (1981)
- Be There or Be Talked About - class 5.11 - Pete Gallagher, Bego Gerhart - (1988)
- Speak No Evil - class 5.10 - Duane Raleigh, Lisa Raleigh - (1994)
- The Crystalline Entity - class 5.9 - David Evans, Tom Sherman, Margy Floyd - (1994)

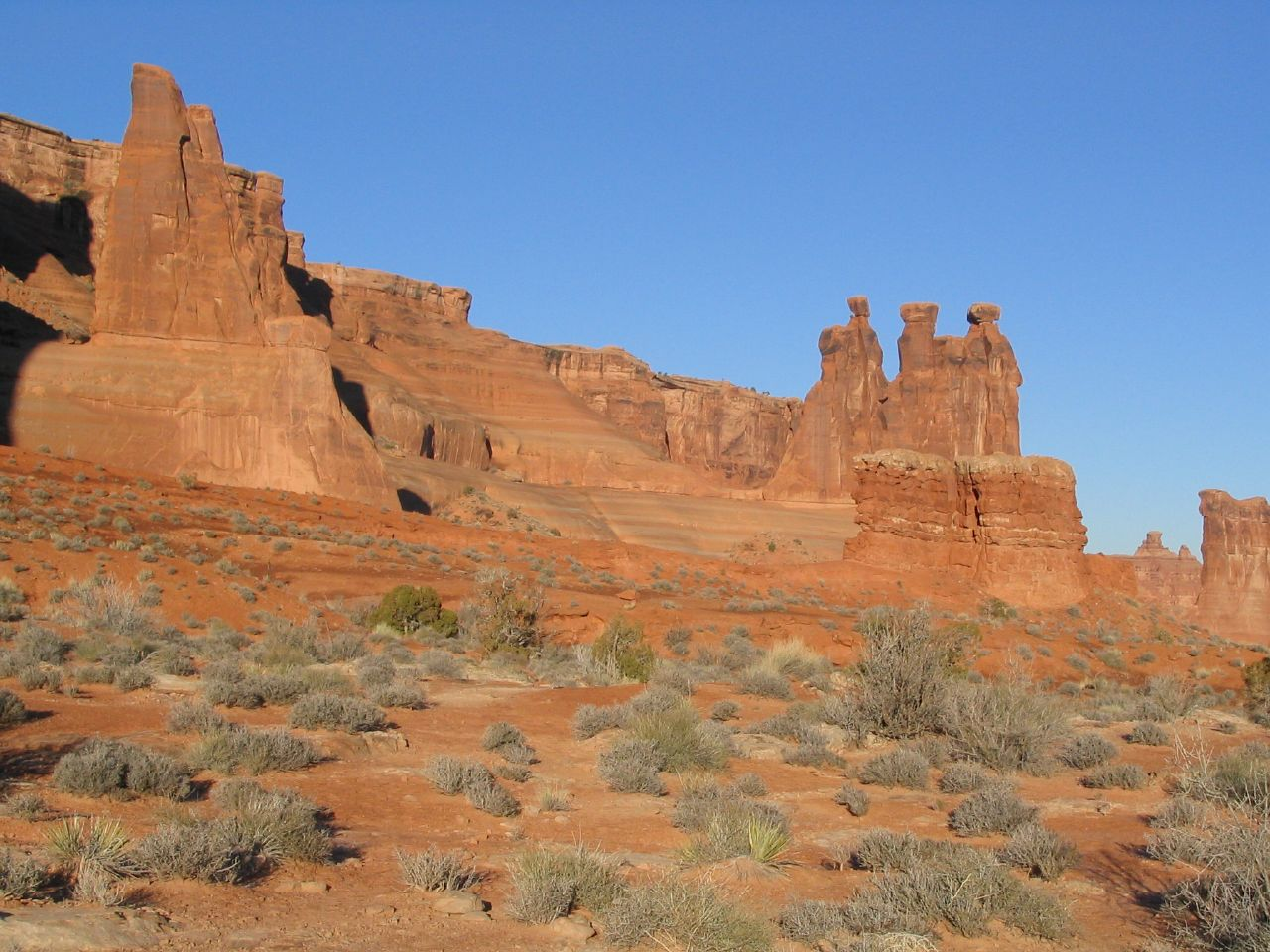
Argon Tower (left) and Three Gossips (right)

== Access ==
The formation can be seen from Courthouse Towers viewpoint and can be accessed through a short hike down into a large wash towards the east side of the pillars.

== See also ==
- Geology of Utah
- Argon Tower
