= Tower of Babel (Utah) =

Summit in Utah, United States

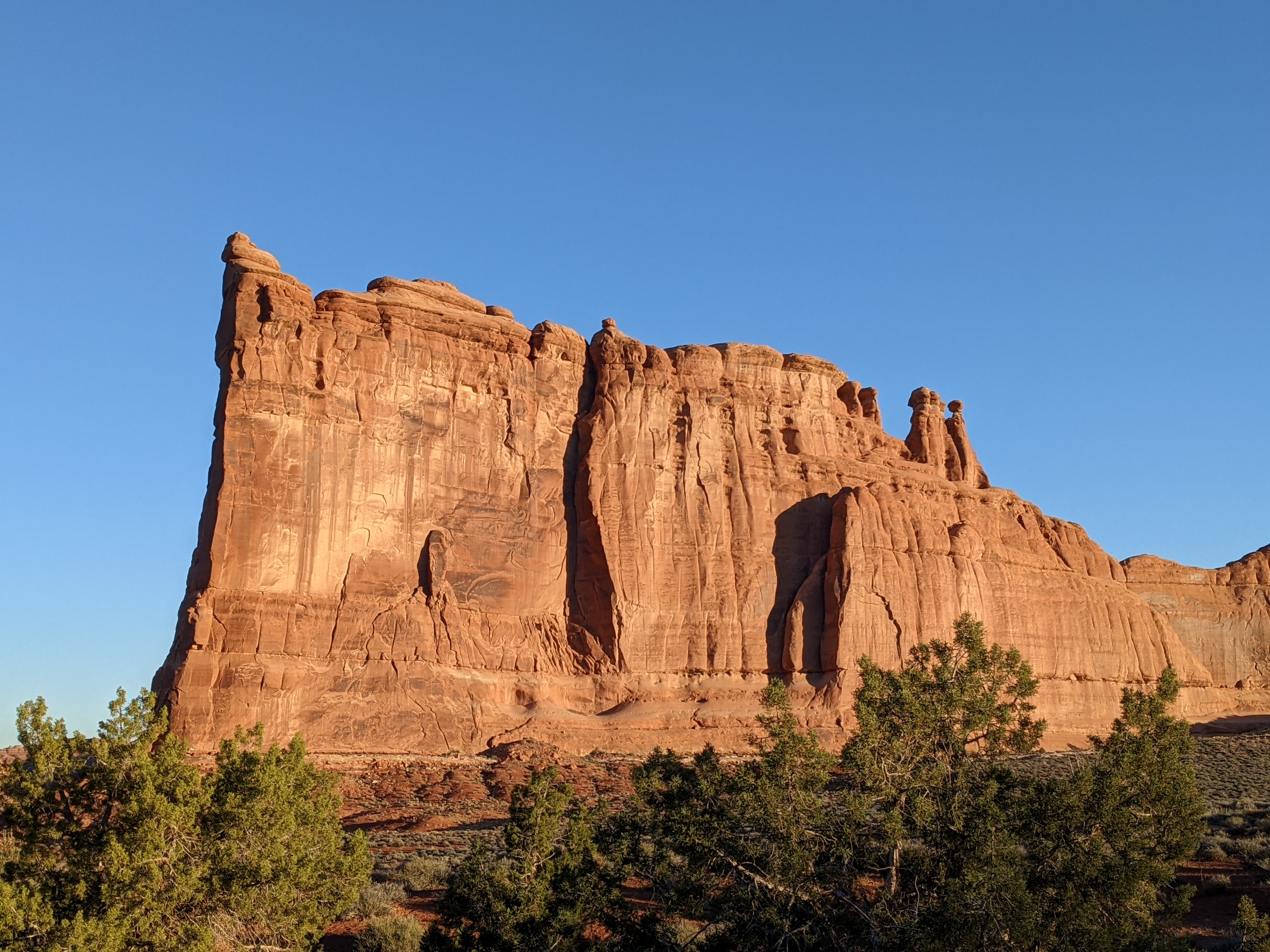
- Southeast aspect

Highest point
- Elevation: 4,655 ft (1,419 m)
- Prominence: 435 ft (133 m)
- Parent peak: The Organ (4,735 ft)
- Isolation: 0.34 mi (0.55 km)
- Coordinates: 38°38′24″N 109°36′10″W

Geography
- Location within Utah Location within the United States
- Country: United States
- State: Utah
- County: Grand
- Protected area: Arches National Park
- Parent range: Colorado Plateau
- Topo map: USGS The Windows Section

Geology
- Rock age: Jurassic
- Mountain type: Butte
- Rock type: Entrada Sandstone

Climbing
- First ascent: 1986
- Easiest route: class 5.4 climbing

Tower of Babel is a 4,655-foot-elevation (1,419-meter) summit in Grand County, Utah. It is located within Arches National Park and like many of the rock formations in the park, it is composed of Entrada Sandstone. The tower is 500 feet tall, and topographic relief is significant as the summit rises 500 feet (152 meters) vertically above the main park road in approximately 200 feet (61 meters) laterally. Precipitation runoff from Tower of Babel drains to the nearby Colorado River via Courthouse Wash. This landform's descriptive toponym has been officially adopted by the United States Board on Geographic Names. This landform was shown briefly in the opening scene of the 1989 American action-adventure film Indiana Jones and the Last Crusade.

== Climbing ==
The first ascent of the summit was made October 17, 1986, by Charlie Fowler, Eric Bjornstad, and Lin Ottinger via the class 5.4 Zenyatta Entrada route. Some consider this the most beautiful climbing route in the park. Another feature on Tower of Babel is The Three Gargoyles, a class 5.11 rock-climbing route first climbed by Jimmie Dunn and Joe Slansky.

== Climate ==
According to the Köppen climate classification system, Tower of Babel is located in a cold semi-arid climate zone with cold winters and hot summers. Spring and fall are the most favorable seasons to experience Arches National Park, when highs average 60 to 80 °F (15 to 25 °C) and lows average 30 to 50 °F (0 to 10 °C). Summer temperatures often exceed 100 °F (40 °C). Winters are cold, with highs averaging 30 to 50 °F (0 to 10 °C), and lows averaging 0 to 20 °F (−20 to −5 °C). As part of a high desert region, it can experience wide daily temperature fluctuations. The park receives an average of less than 10 inches (25 cm) of rain annually.

== Gallery ==
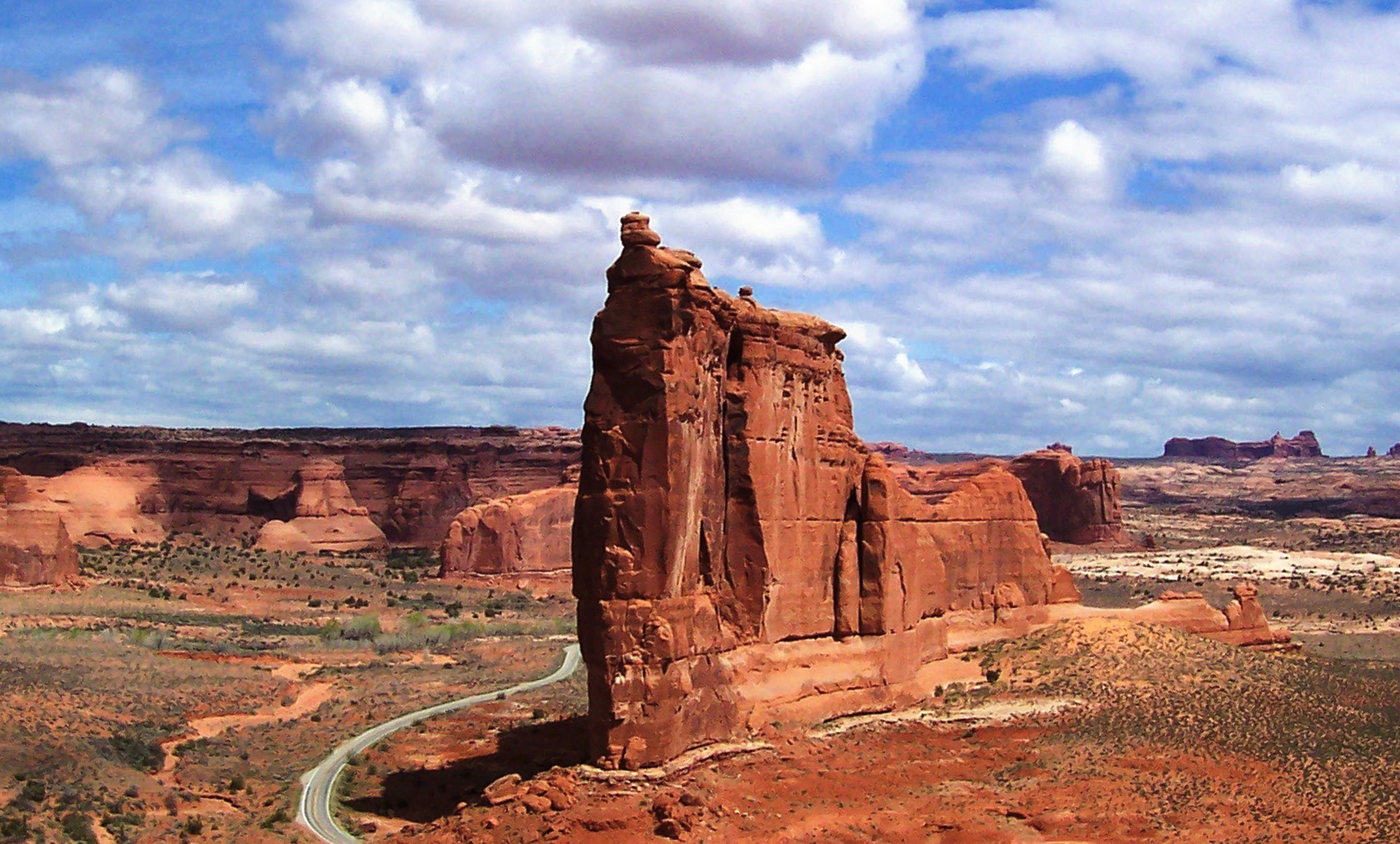
South aspect, with main park road

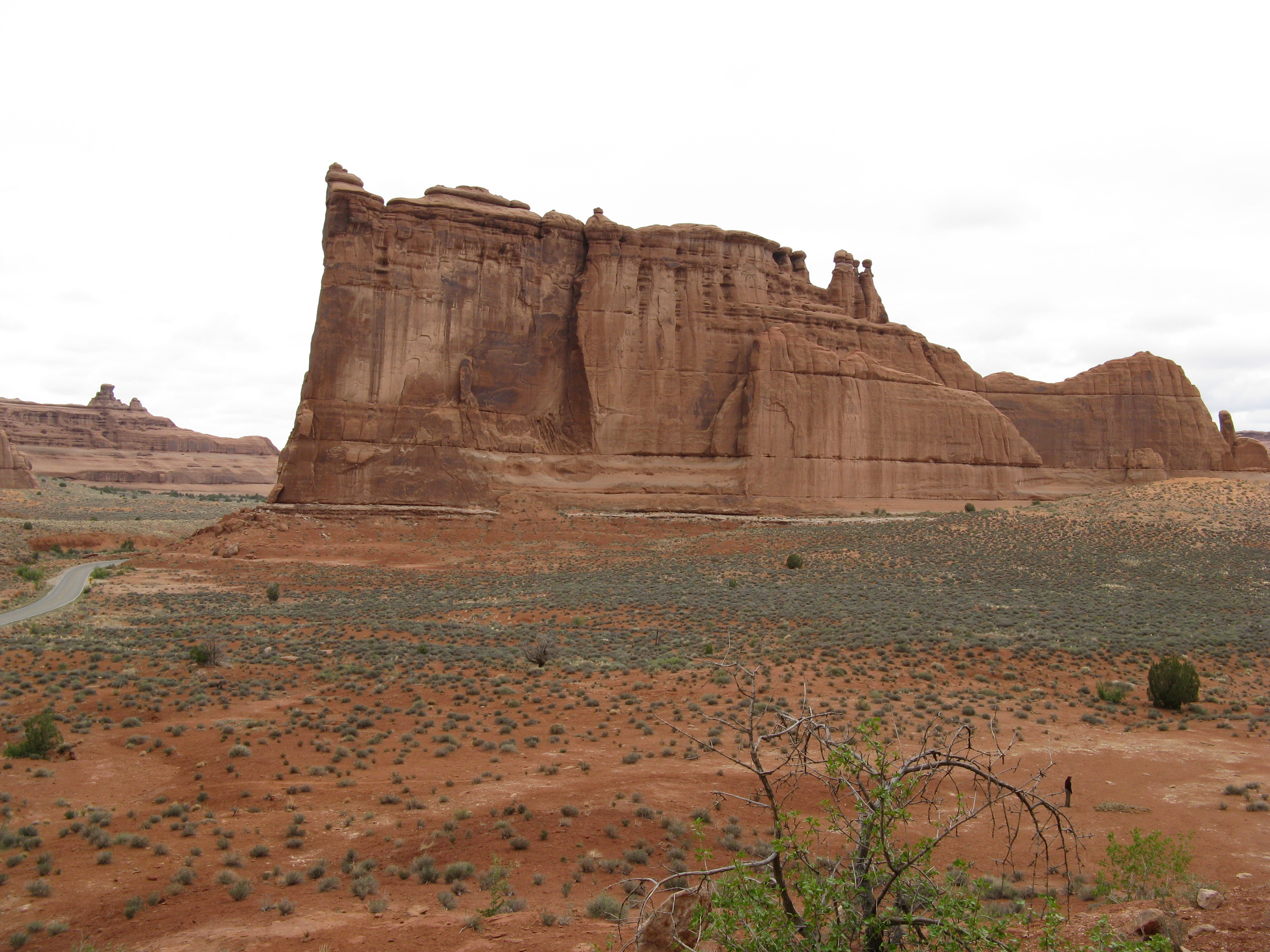
Southeast aspect

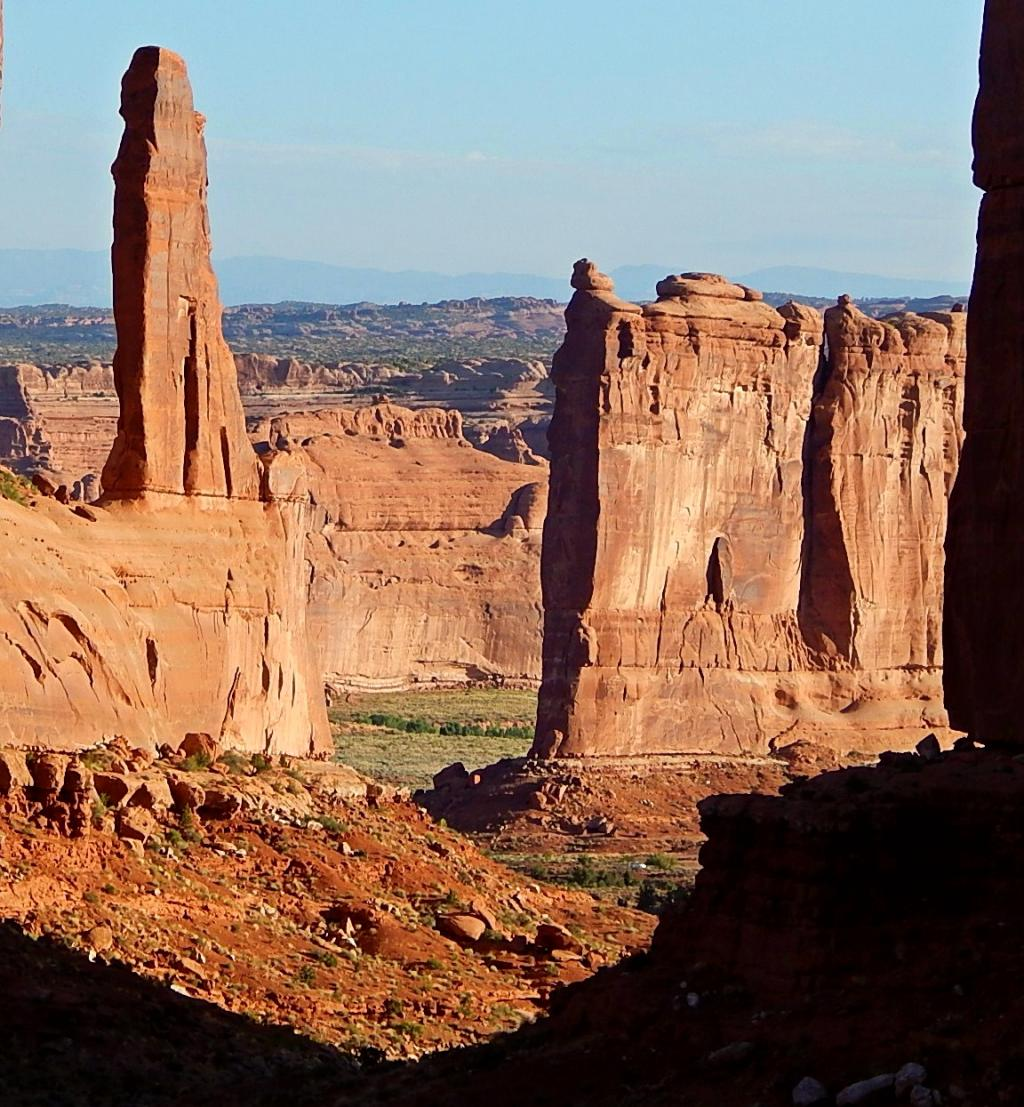
Argon Tower (left), Tower of Babel (right)

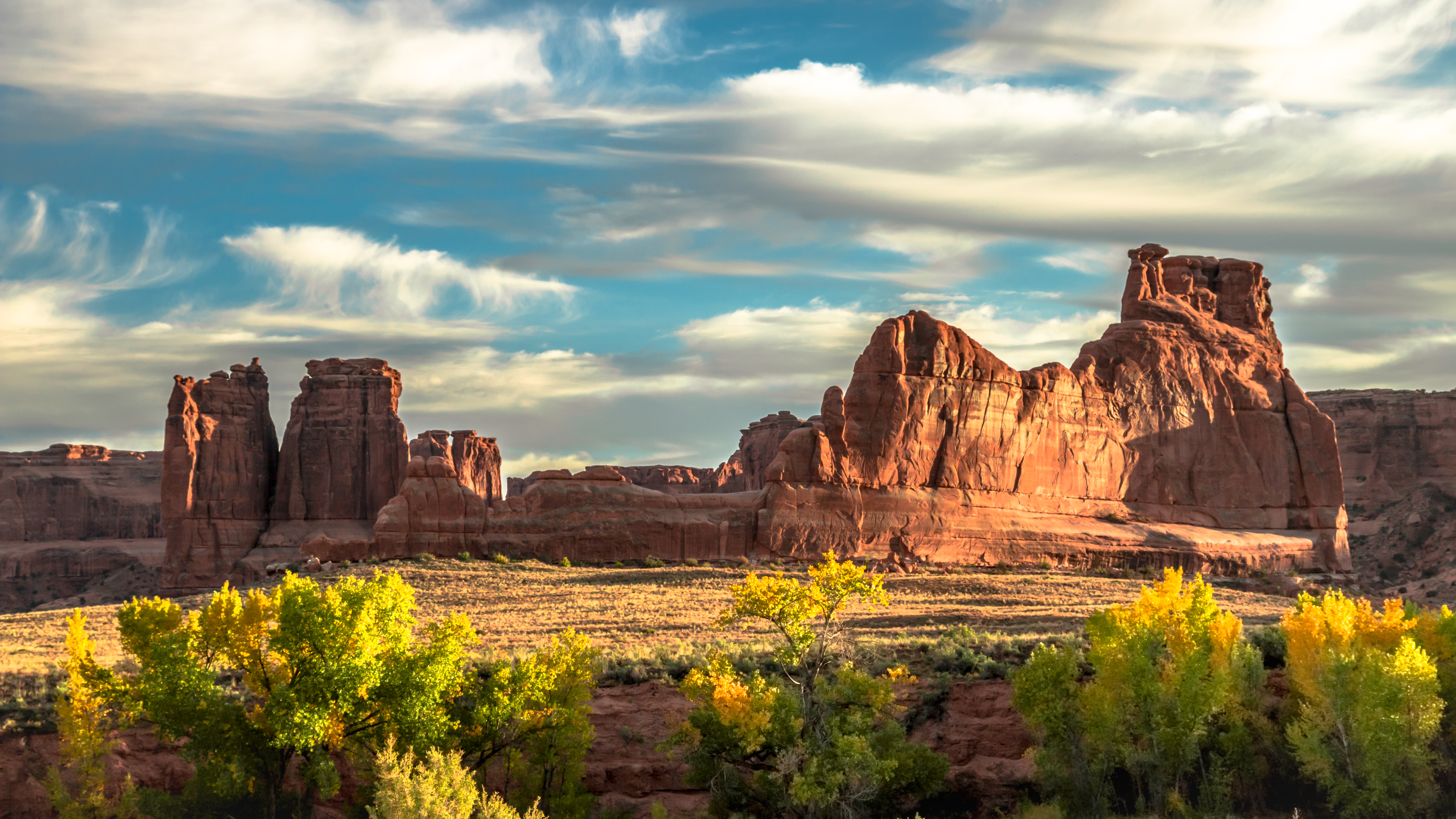
The Organ (left) and Tower of Babel (right) viewed from the north

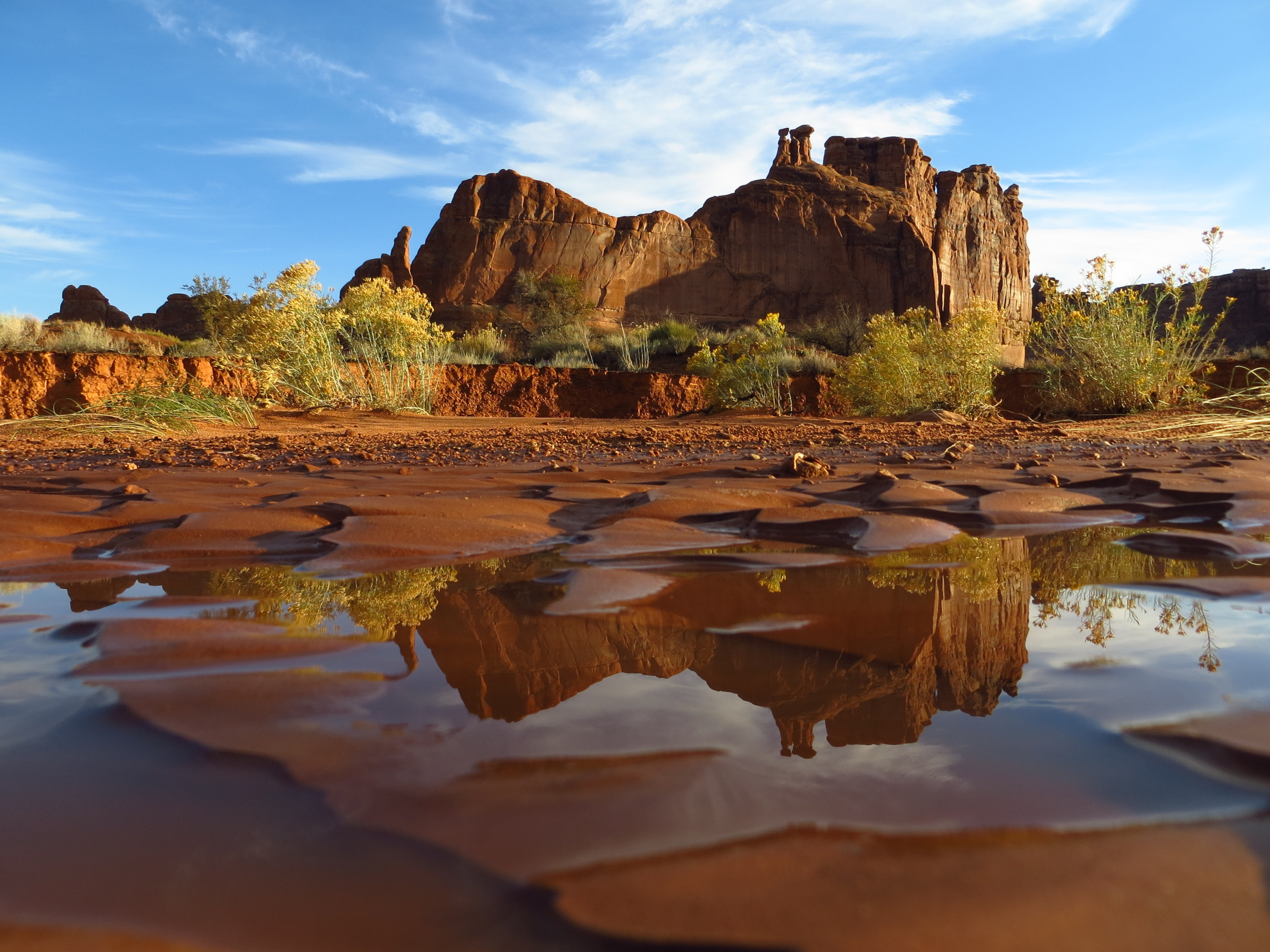
Tower of Babel viewed from the north at Courthouse Wash

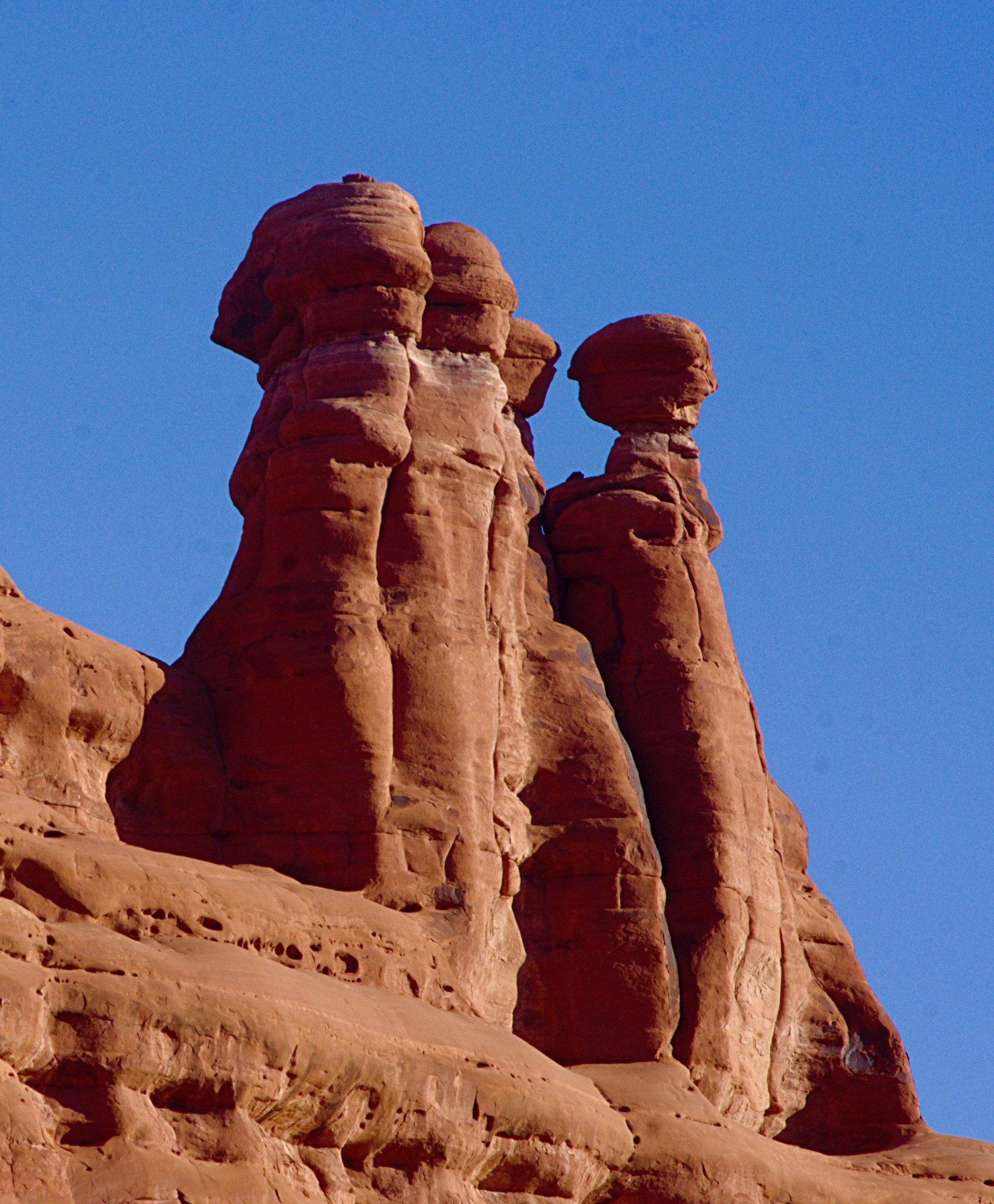
"The Three Gargoyles" are farther north of the summit along the fin of Tower of Babel

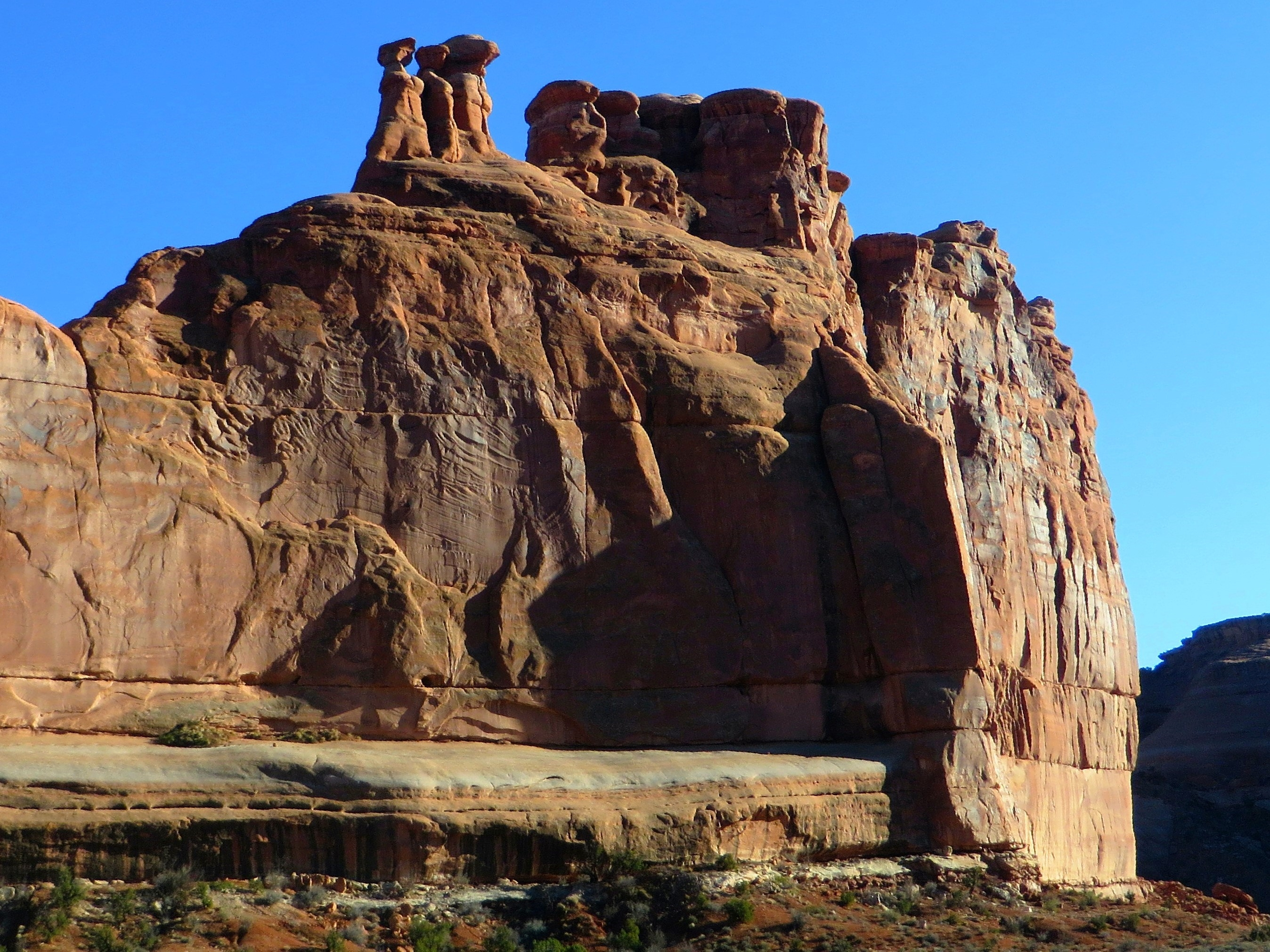
North aspect

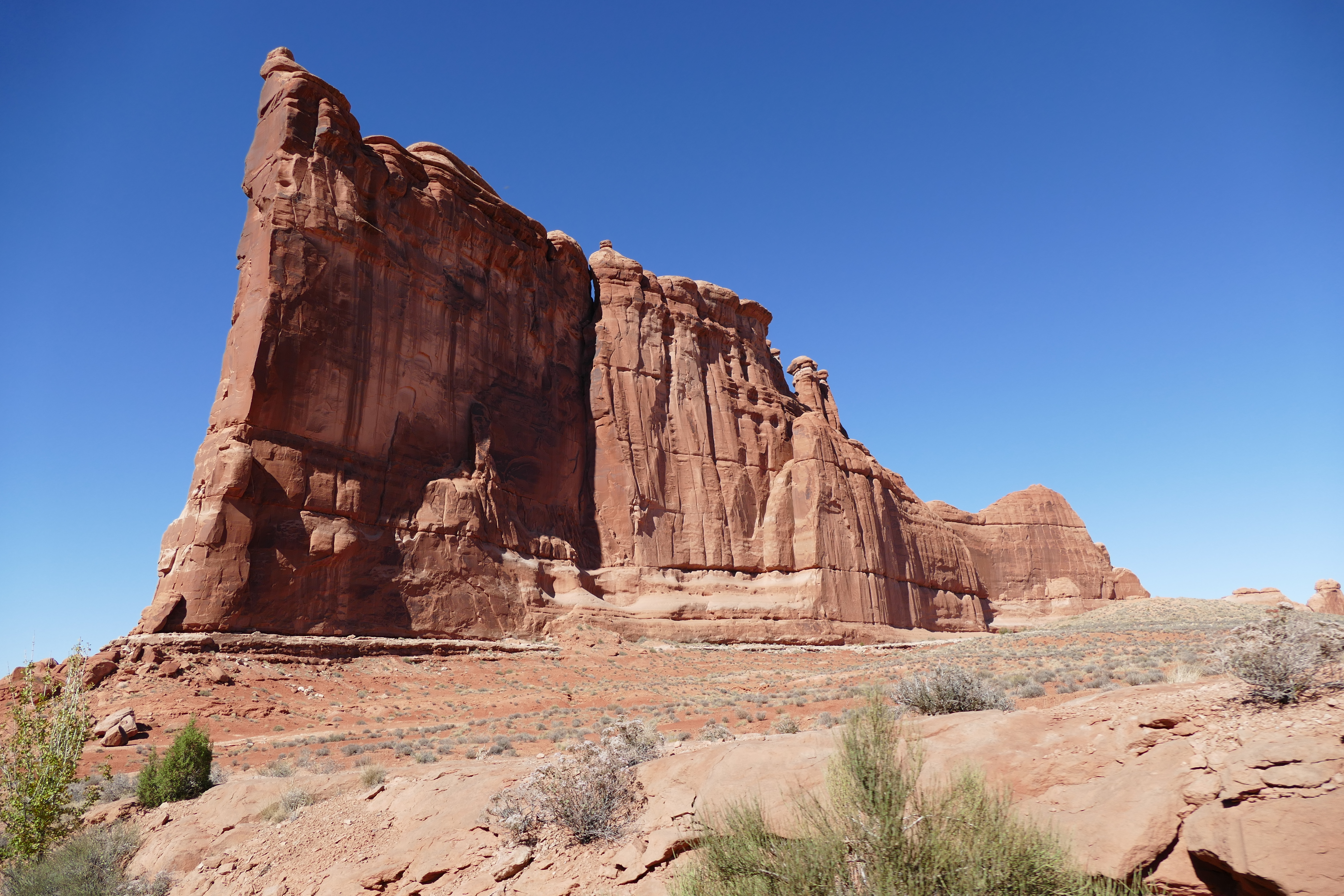

== See also ==
- Geology of Utah
