= Argon Tower =

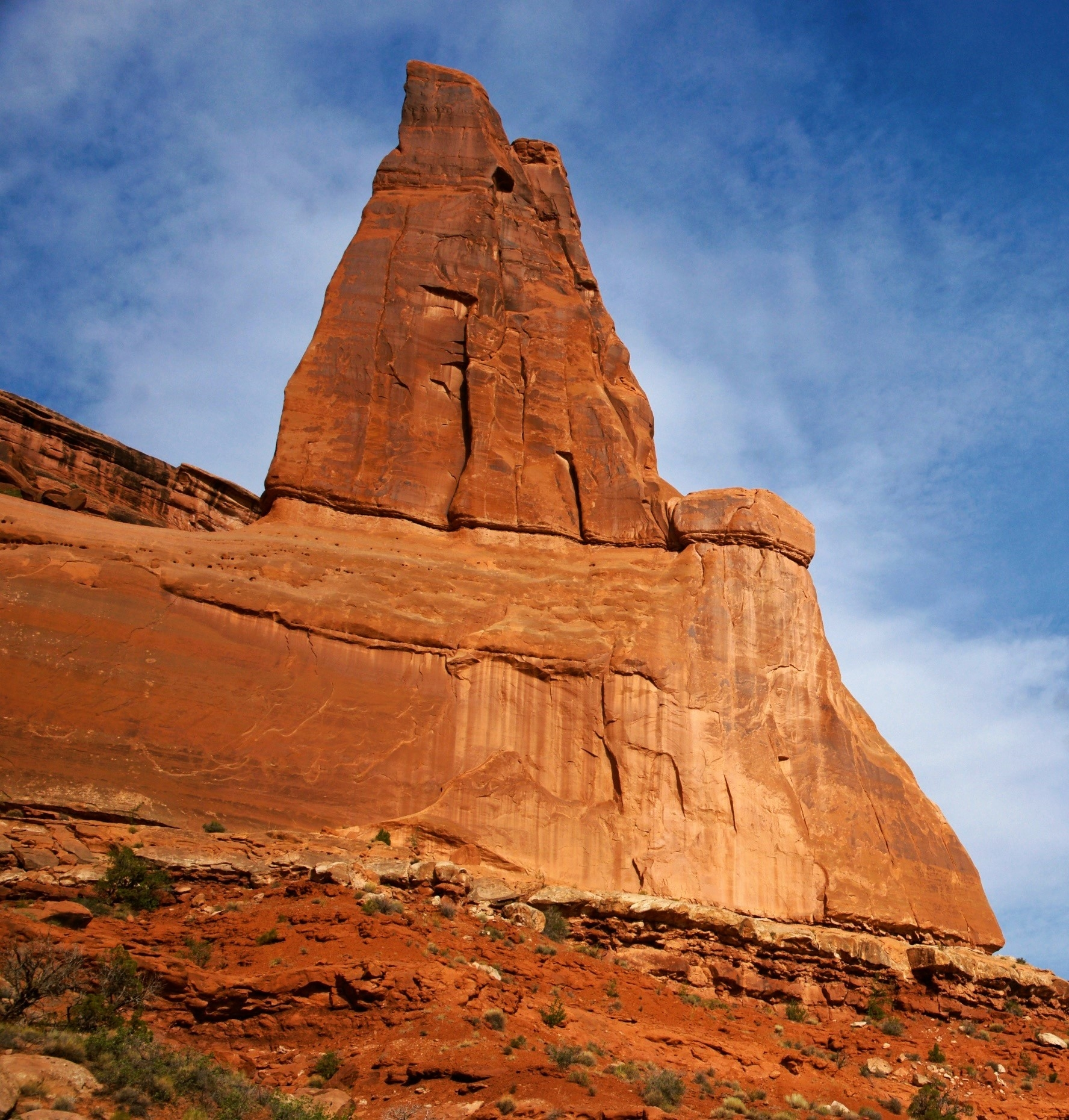
- Southeast aspect

Highest point
- Elevation: 4,750 ft (1,448 m)
- Prominence: 230 ft (70 m)
- Parent peak: The Organ (4,735 ft)
- Isolation: 0.28 mi (0.45 km)
- Coordinates: 38°37′59″N 109°36′07″W

Geography
- Location within Utah Location within the United States
- Country: United States
- State: Utah
- County: Grand
- Protected area: Arches National Park
- Parent range: Colorado Plateau
- Topo map: USGS The Windows Section

Geology
- Rock age: Jurassic
- Rock type: Entrada Sandstone

Climbing
- First ascent: 1964 by Layton Kor
- Easiest route: class 5.9 climbing

Argon Tower is a 4,750-foot-elevation (1,448-meter) pillar in Grand County, Utah. It is located within Arches National Park and like many of the rock formations in the park, Argon Tower is composed of Entrada Sandstone. The tower is 260 feet tall, and topographic relief is significant as the summit rises 450 feet (137 meters) vertically above the Park Avenue Trail in 400 feet (122 meters) laterally. Precipitation runoff from Argon Tower drains to the nearby Colorado River via Courthouse Wash. This landform was shown briefly in the opening scene credits of the 1989 American action-adventure film Indiana Jones and the Last Crusade.

== Climbing ==
The first ascent of the summit was made January 17, 1964, by Layton Kor, Bob Bradley, and Charlie Kemp via the class 5.9 North Face. Layton Kor named this tower.

Other rock-climbing routes on Argon Tower:

- North Northeast Arête - class 5.11
- West Face - class 5.11 - John Pease, Steve Cheyney - (1972)

== Climate ==
According to the Köppen climate classification system, Argon Tower is located in a cold semi-arid climate zone with cold winters and hot summers. Spring and fall are the most favorable seasons to experience Arches National Park, when highs average 60 to 80 °F (15 to 25 °C) and lows average 30 to 50 °F (0 to 10 °C). Summer temperatures often exceed 100 °F (40 °C). Winters are cold, with highs averaging 30 to 50 °F (0 to 10 °C), and lows averaging 0 to 20 °F (−20 to −5 °C). As part of a high desert region, it can experience wide daily temperature fluctuations. The park receives an average of less than 10 inches (25 cm) of rain annually.

== Gallery ==
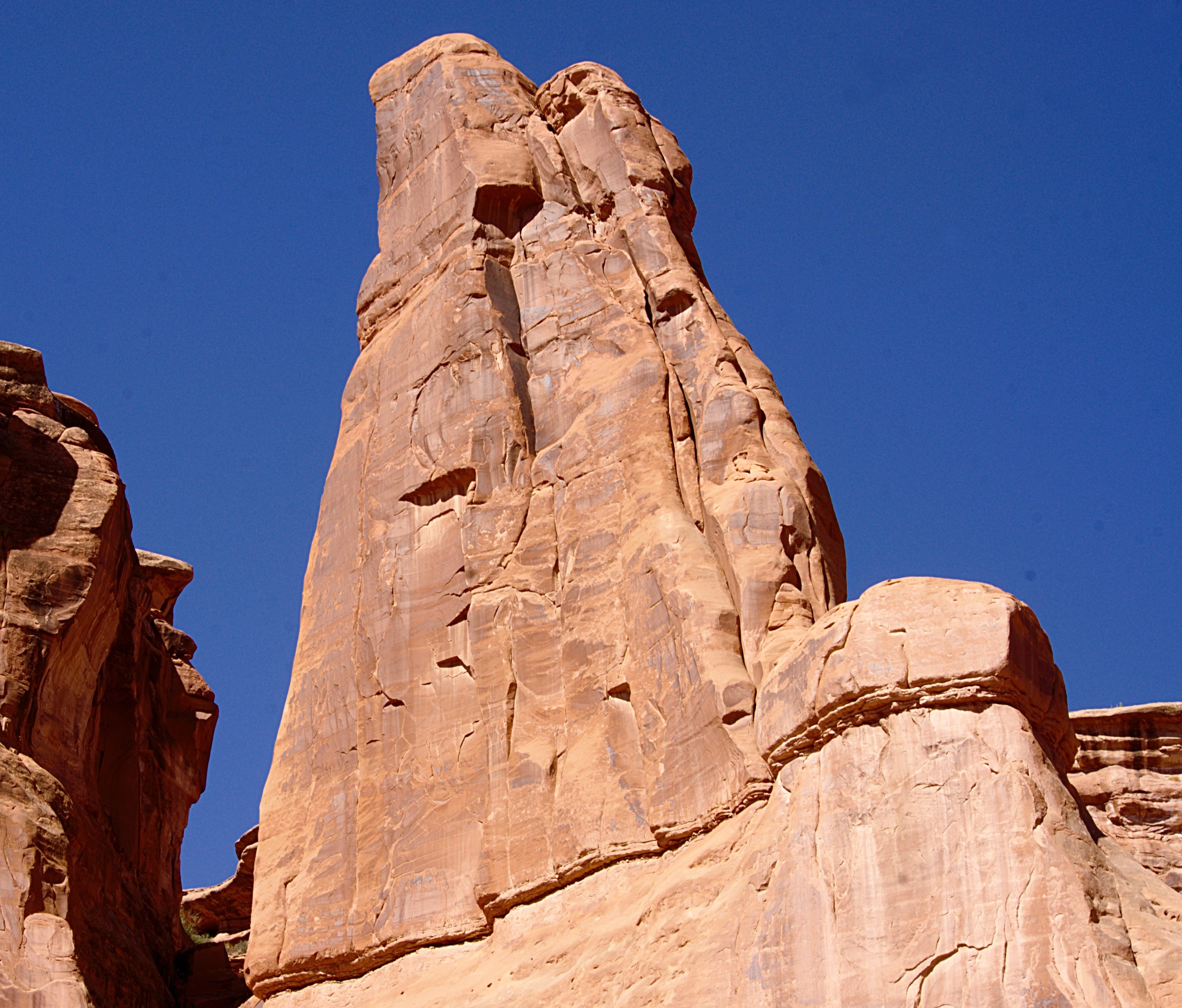
Northeast aspect

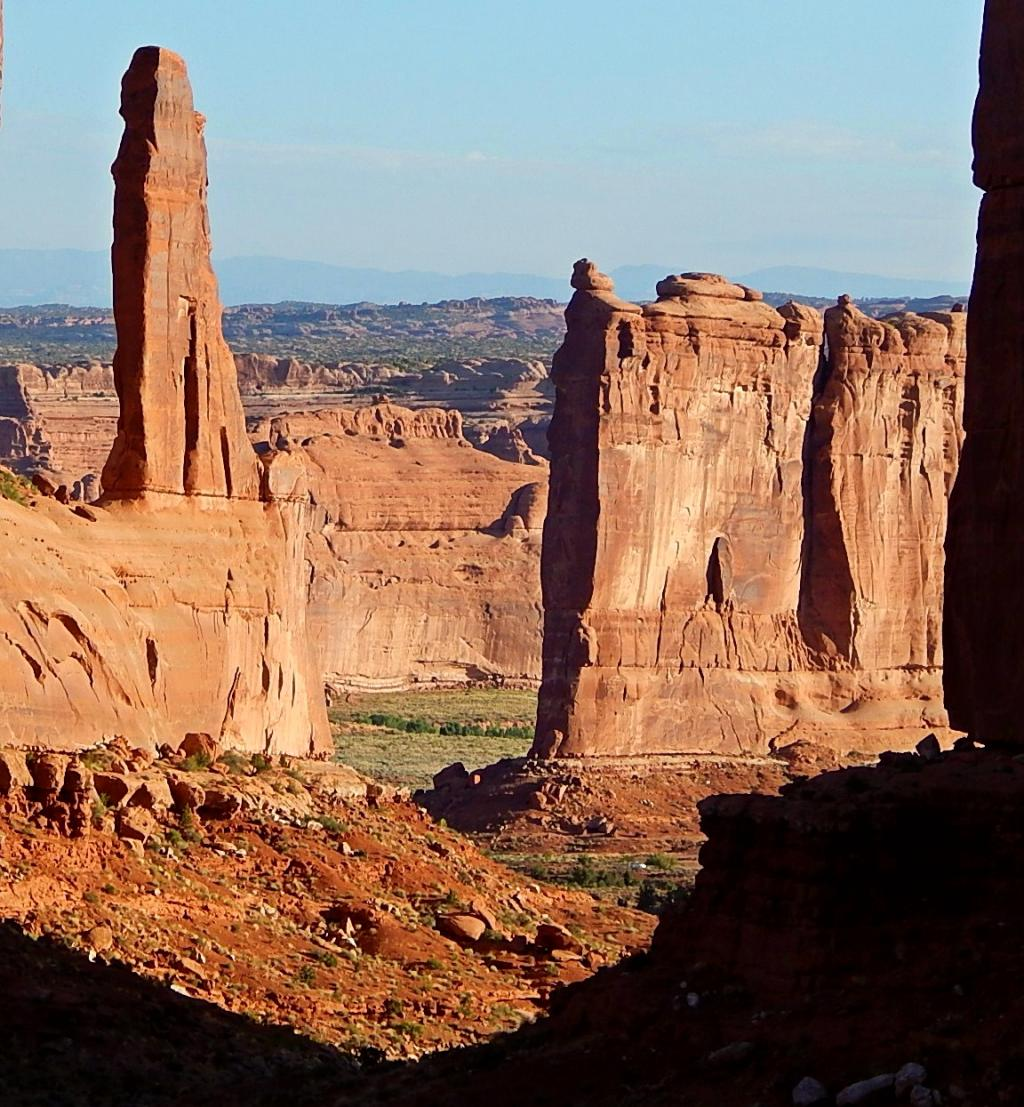
Argon Tower to left, Tower of Babel (right)

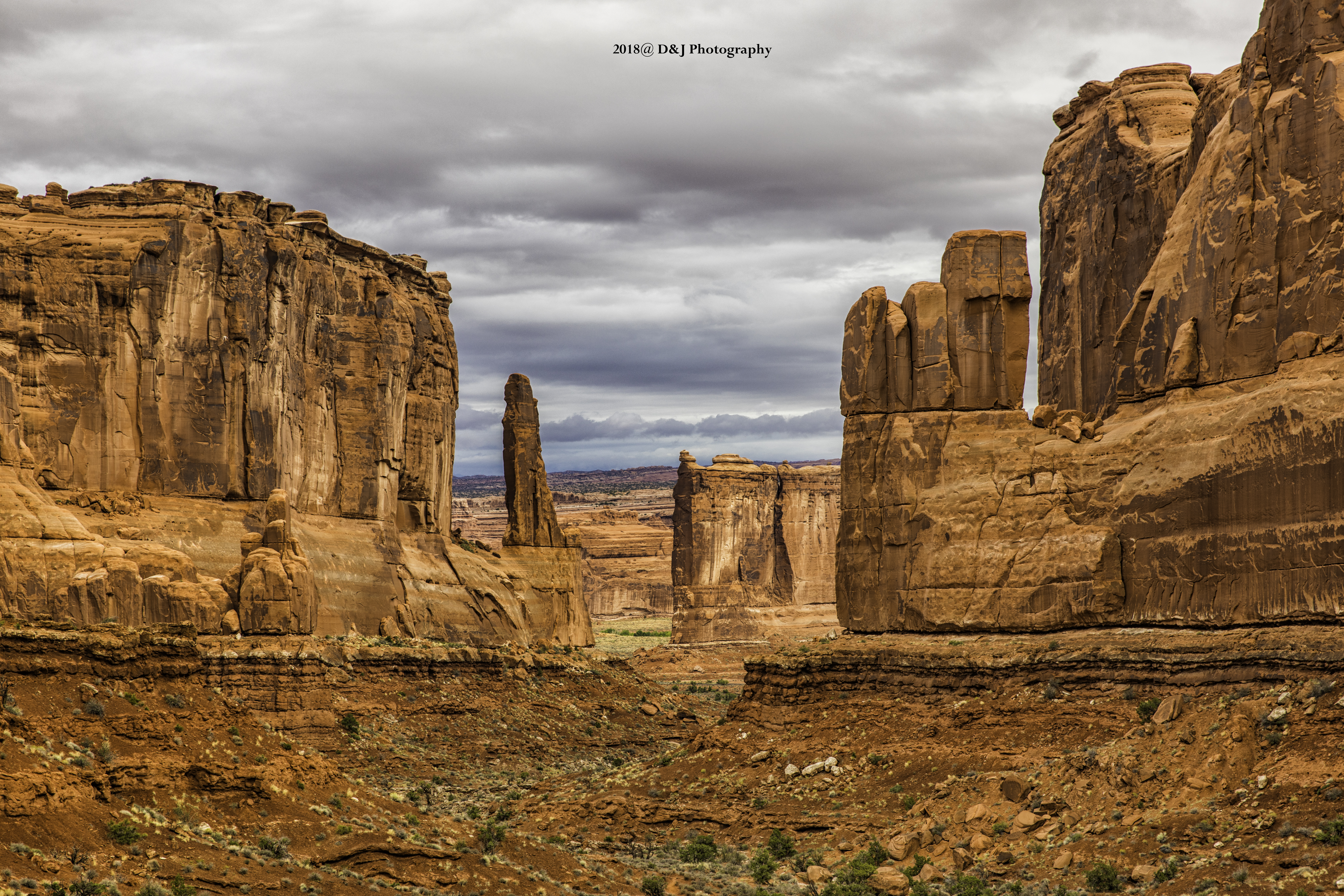
Argon Tower left of center

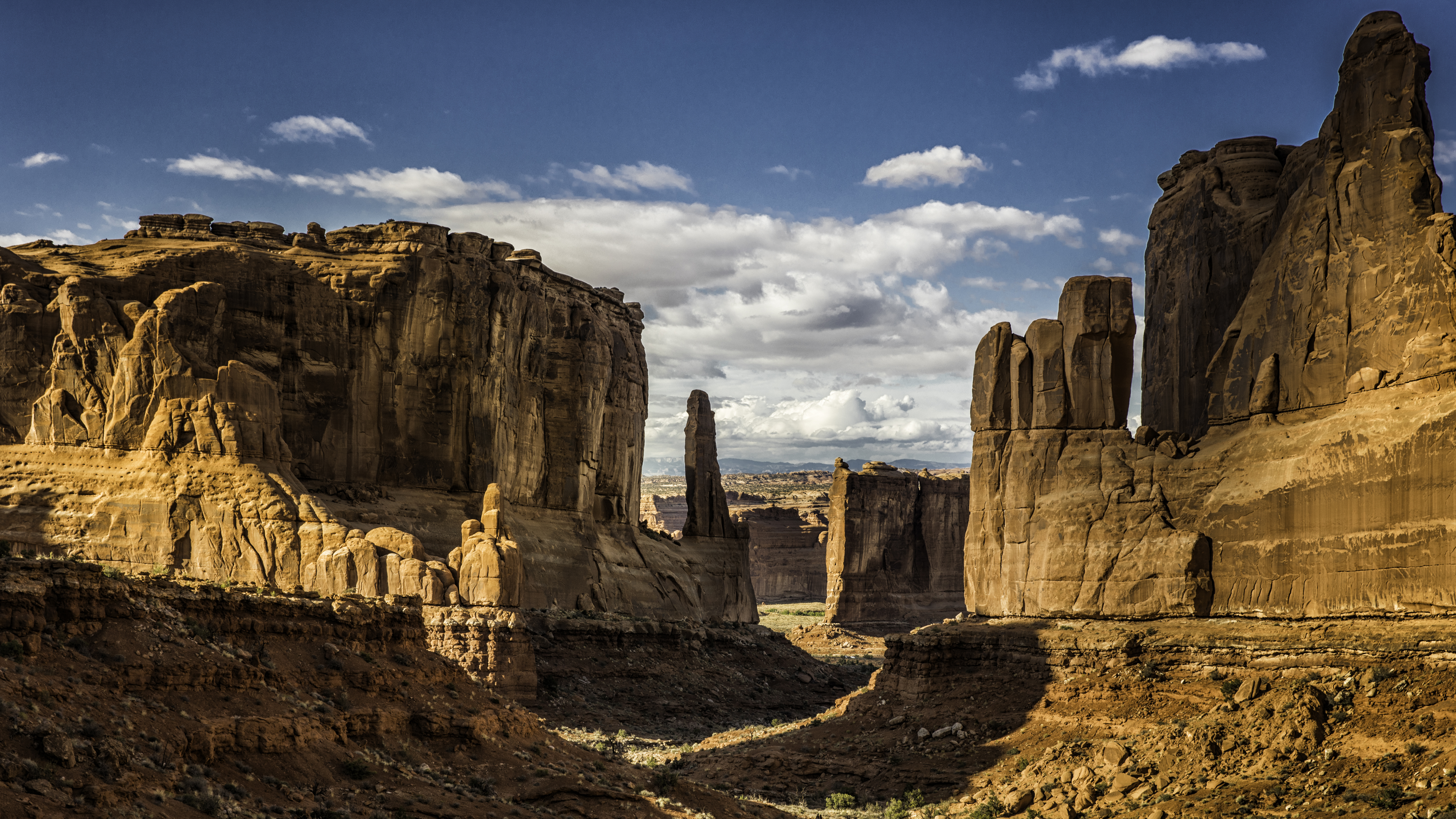
Argon Tower centered

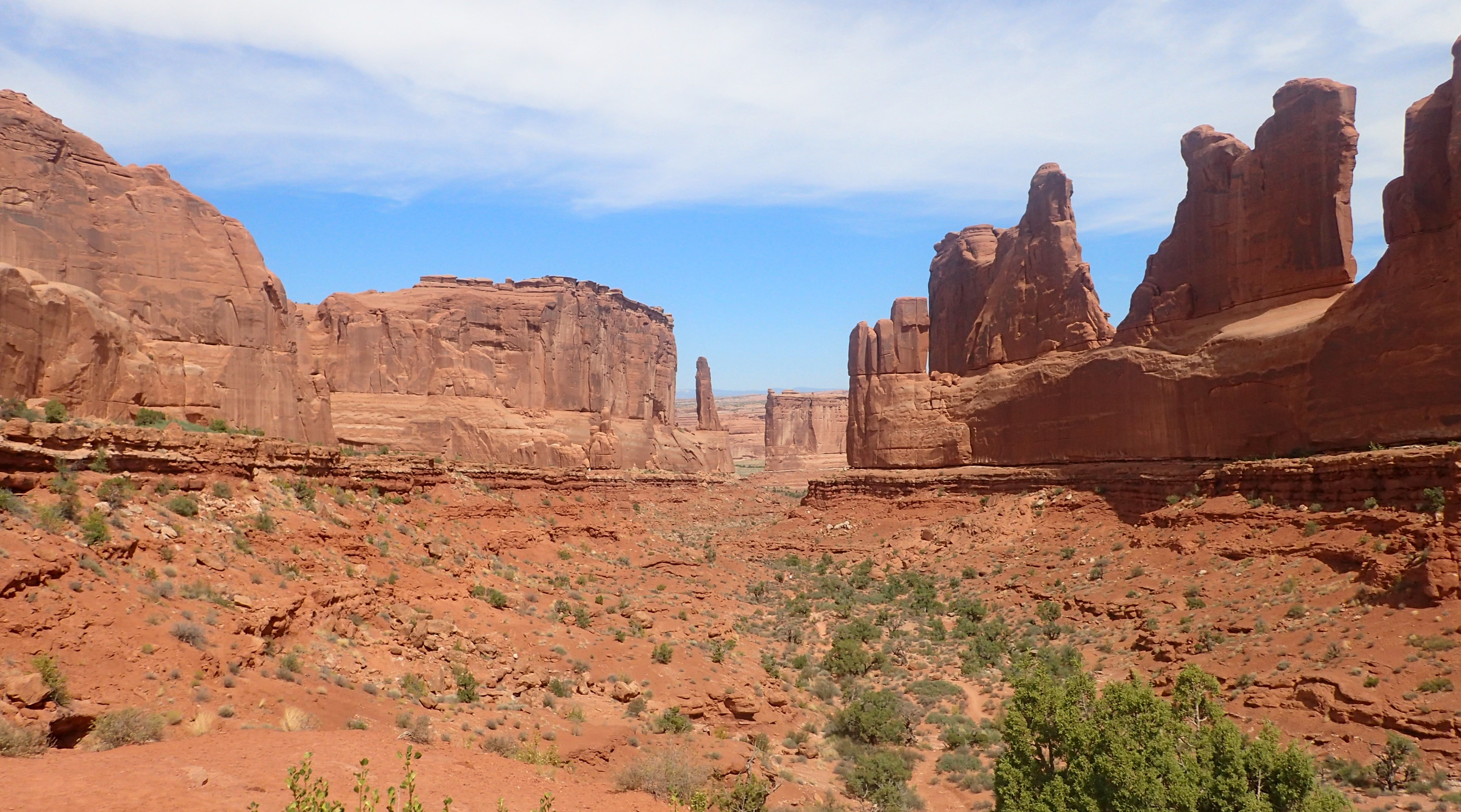
Argon Tower centered, south aspect, from Park Avenue Overlook

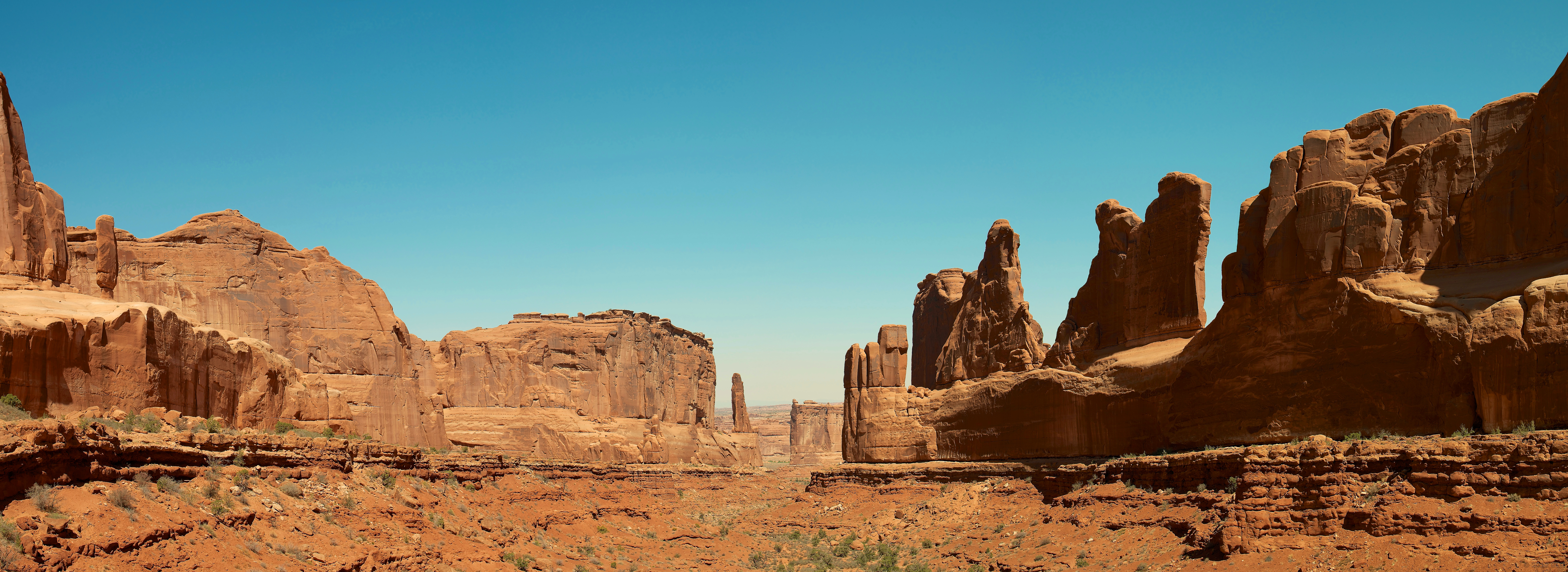
Argon Tower centered in the distance

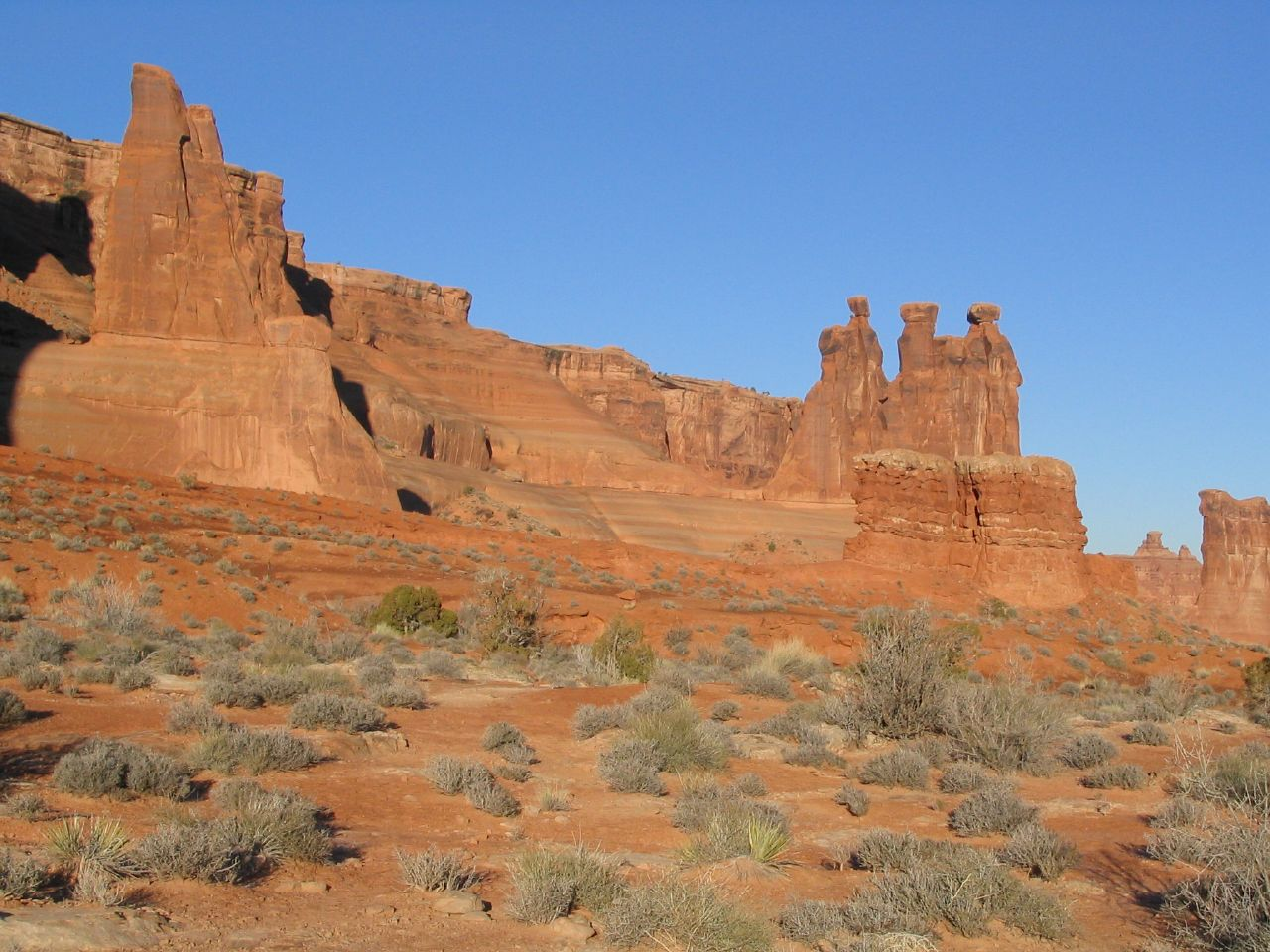
Argon Tower (left), Three Gossips (right)

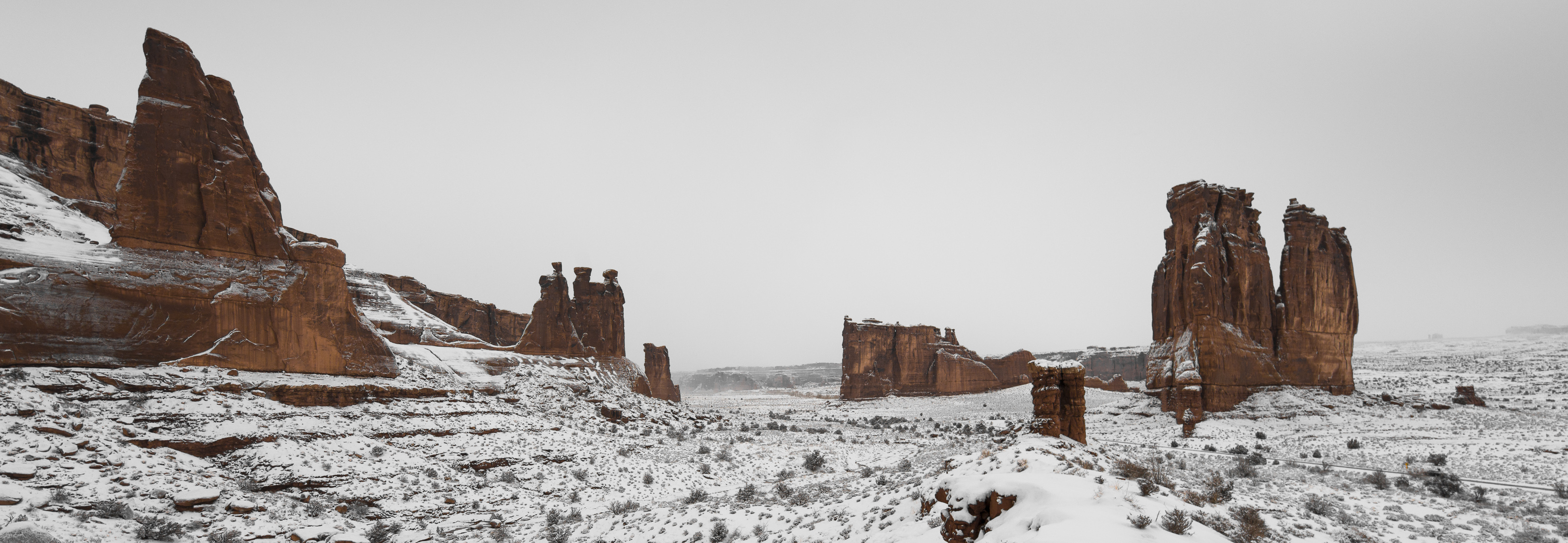
Argon Tower (left), Three Gossips, The Organ (right)

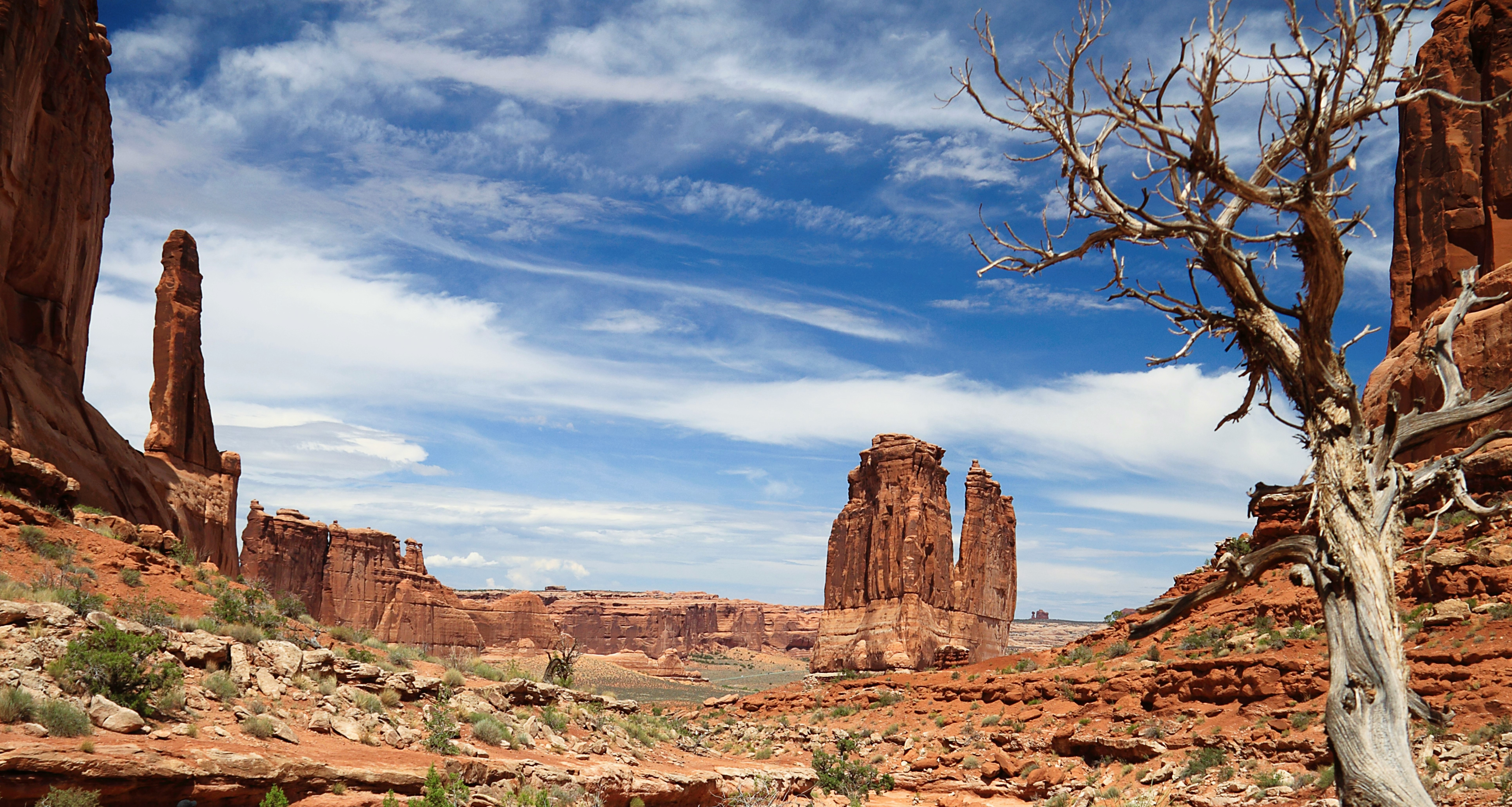
Argon Tower (left), The Organ (right). Layton Kor named Argon Tower, but later in life couldn't recall the reason why he chose that name. Perhaps it was a play on words: Argon ← Organ

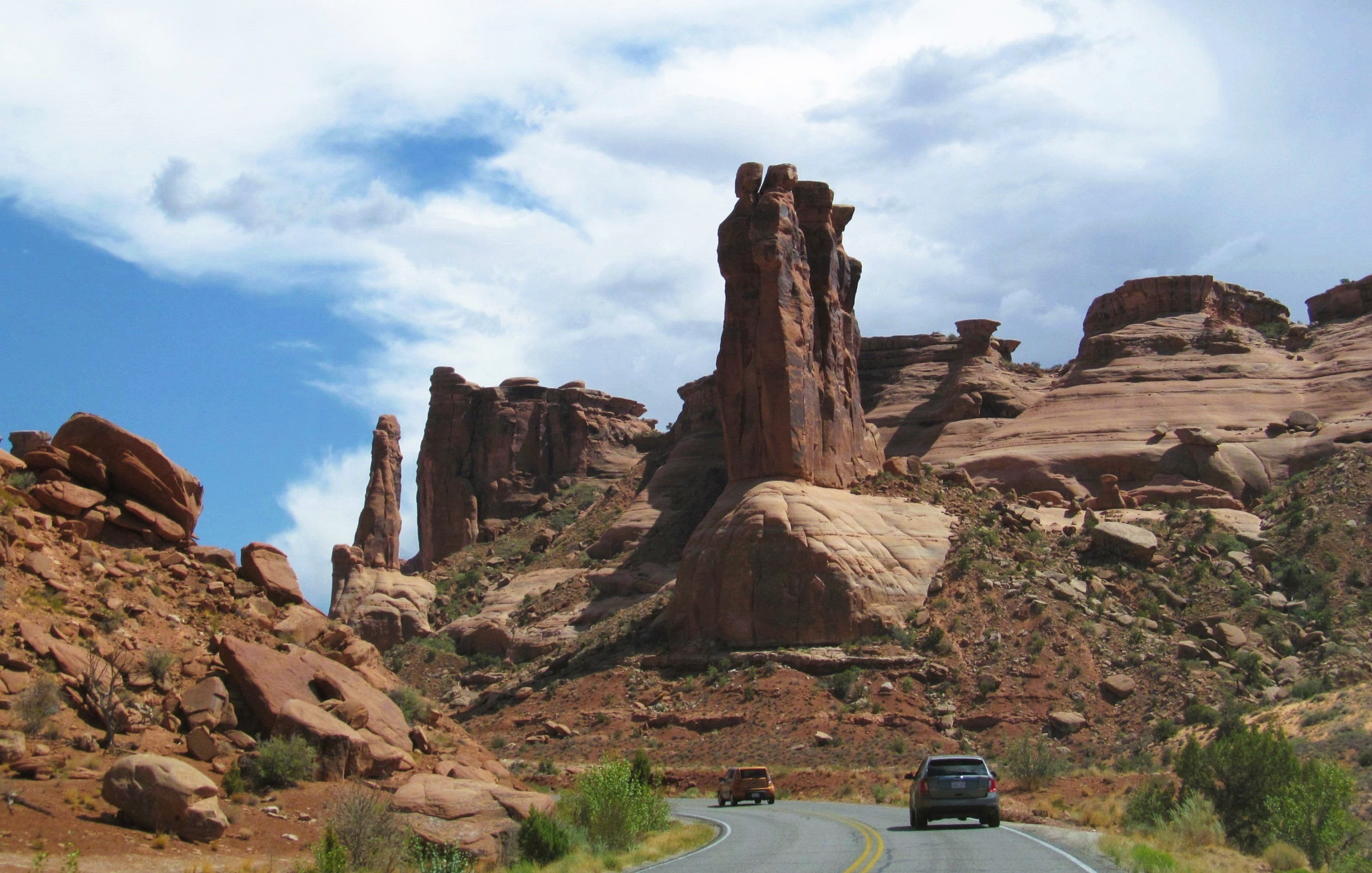
Three Gossips (centered) and Argon Tower (left) viewed from the north

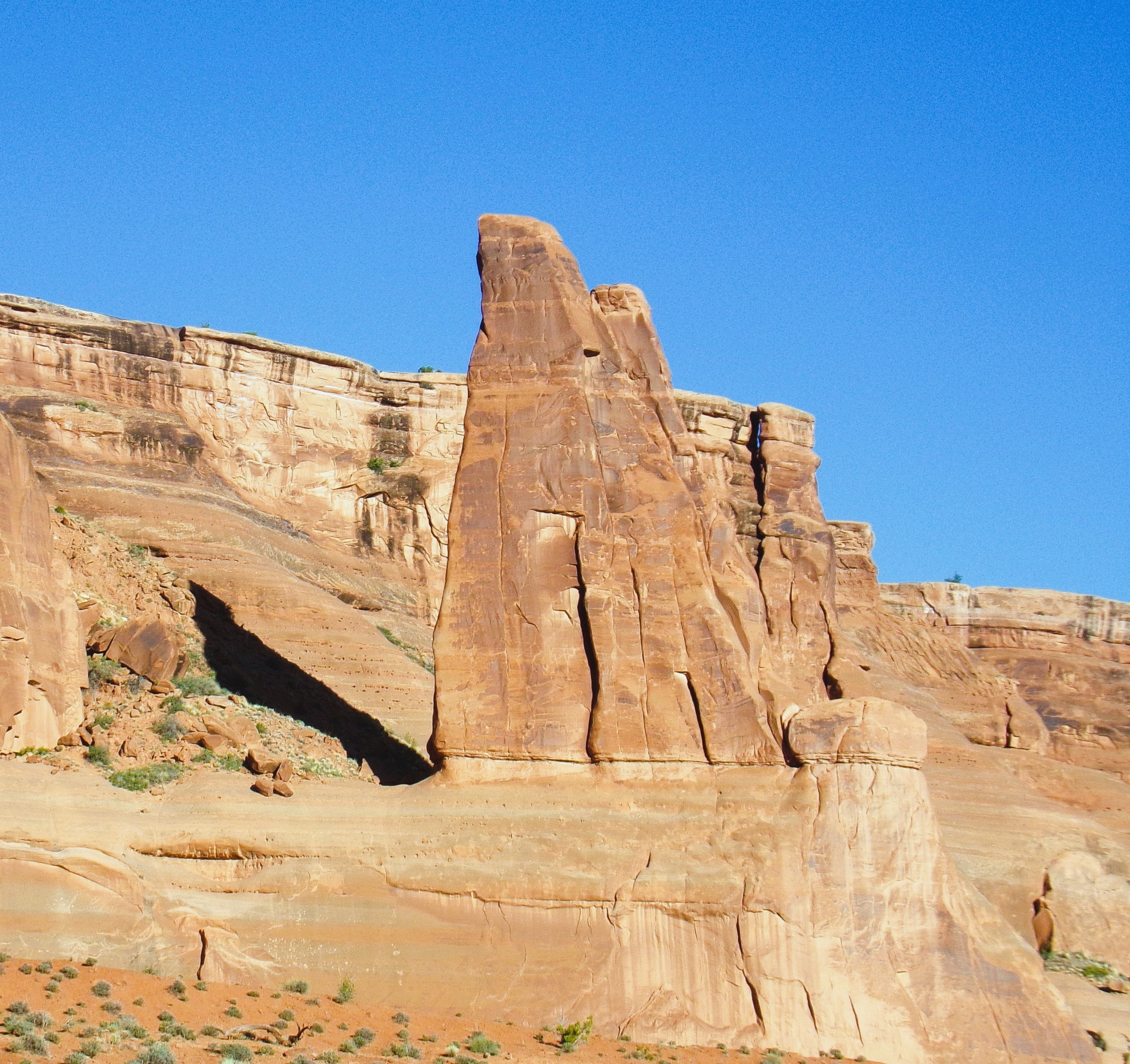
Southeast aspect

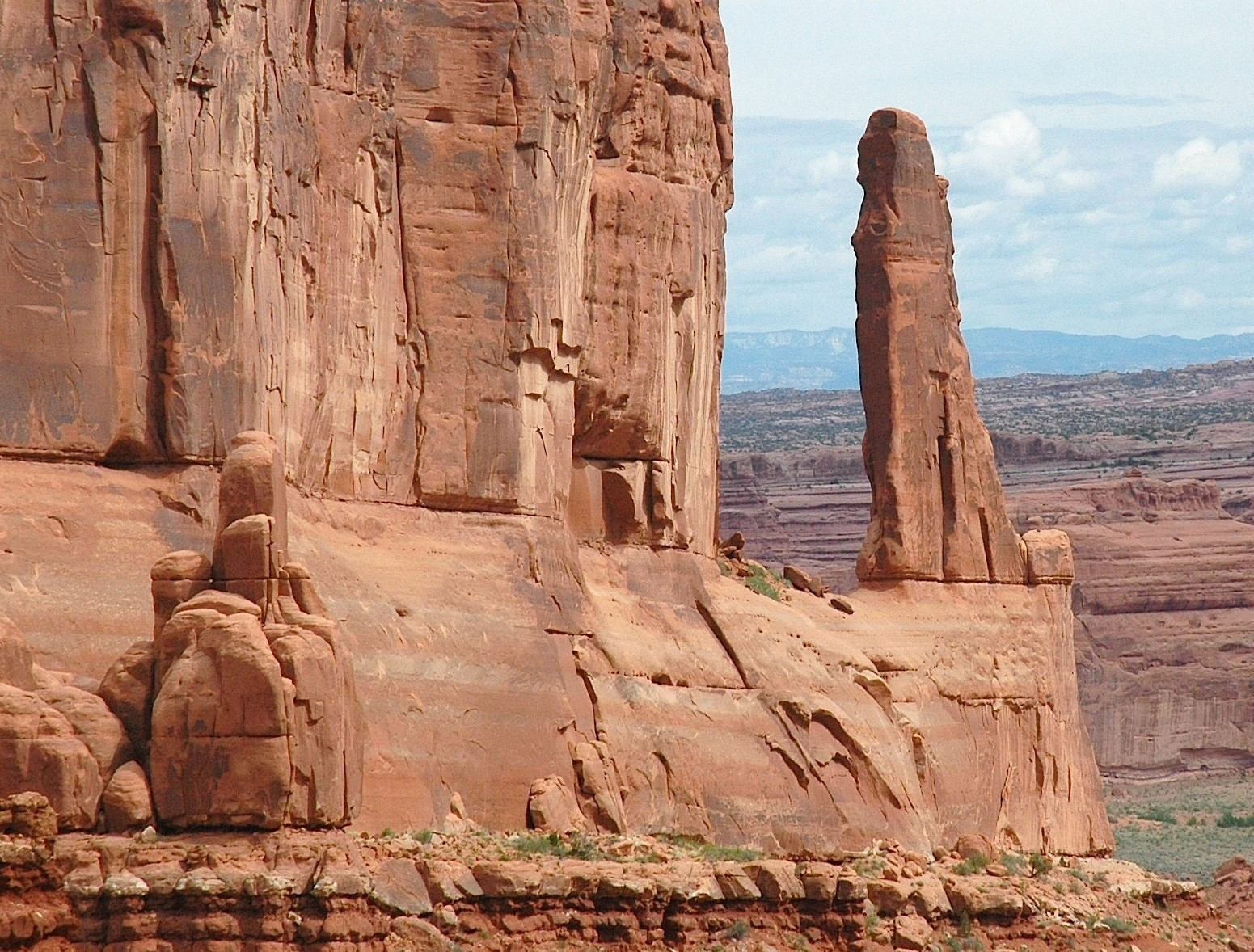
Jello Tower (lower left) and Argon Tower (upper right)

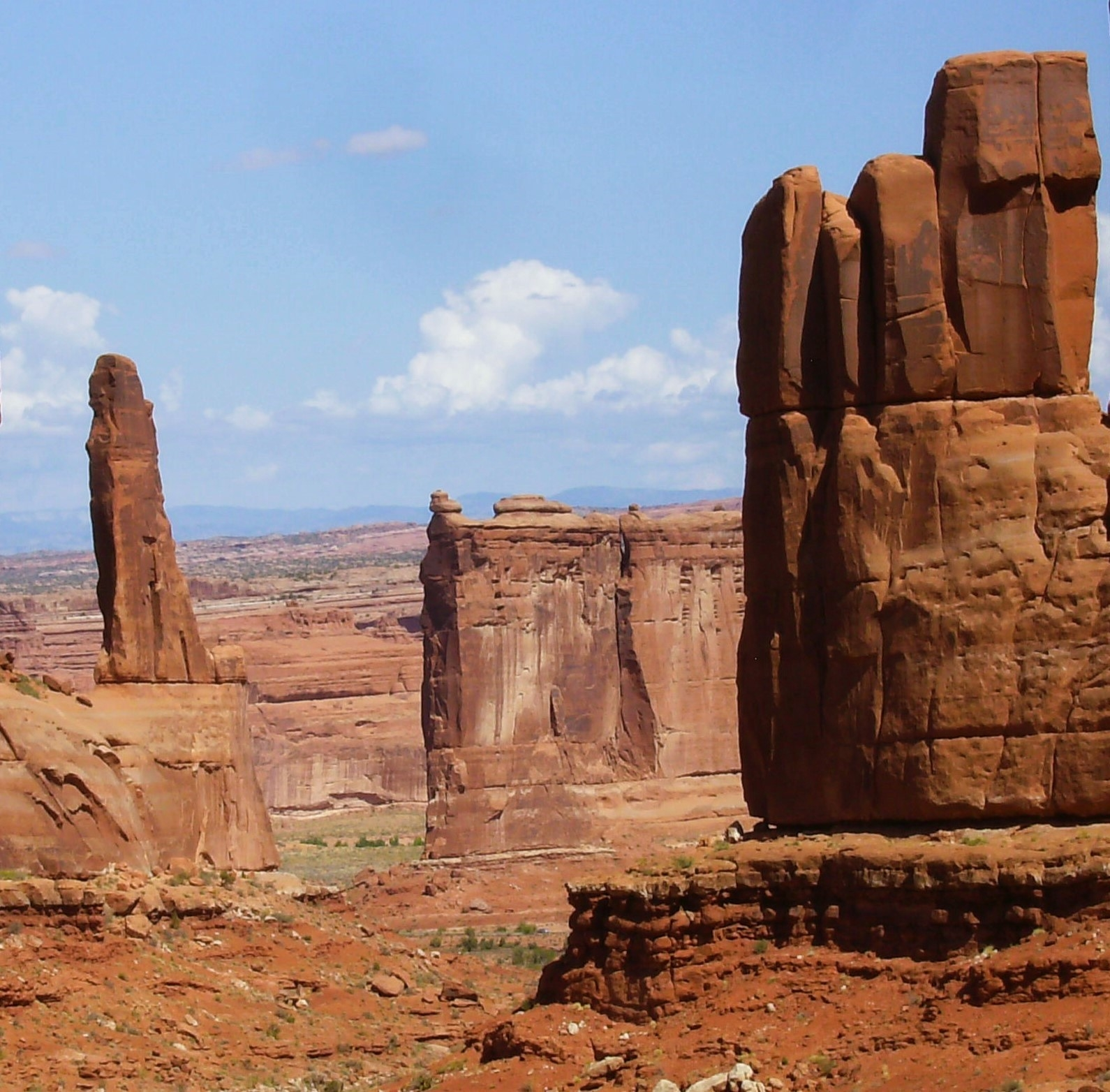
Argon Tower (left), Tower of Babel (centered), The Candelabrum (right)

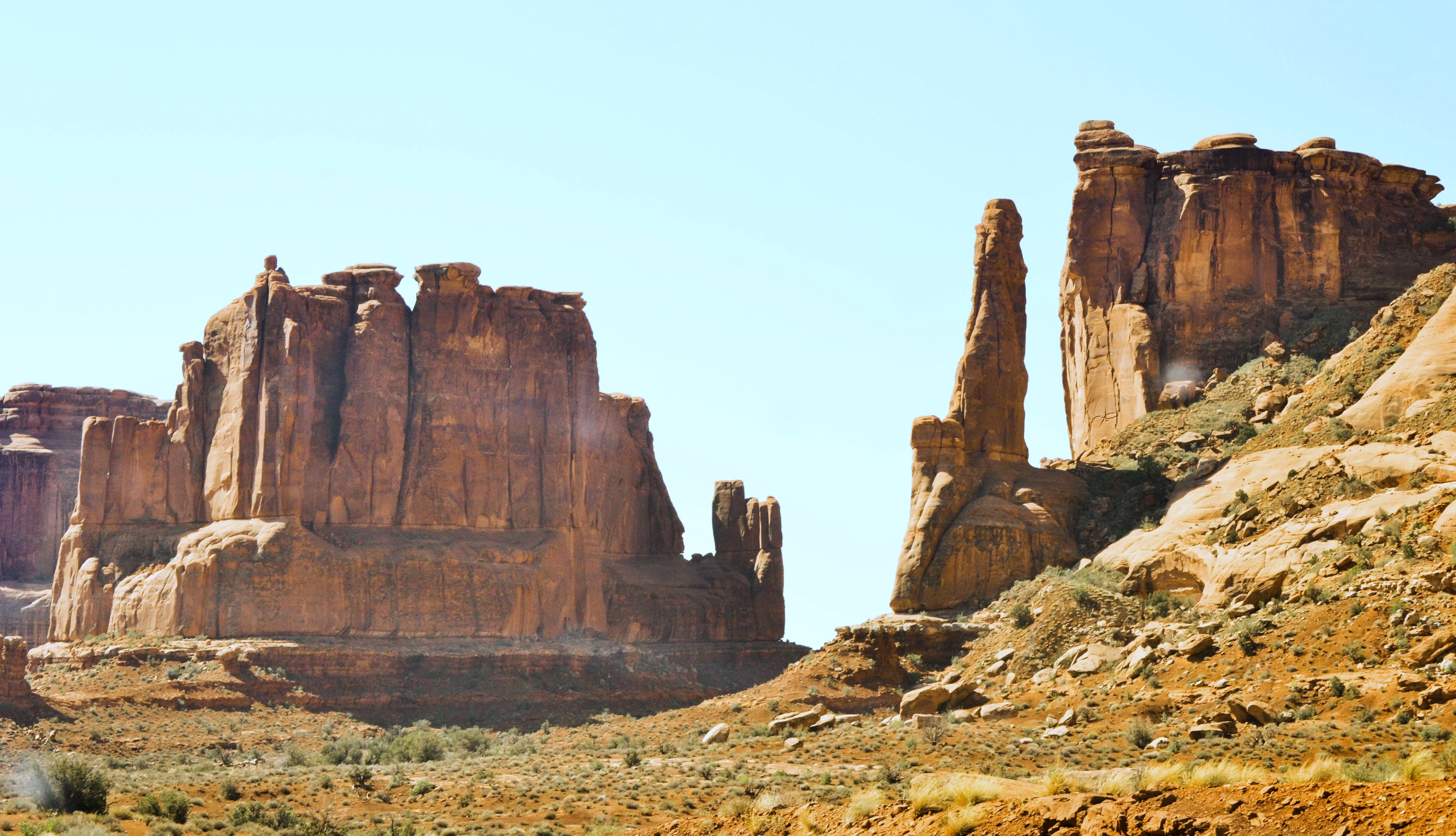
Argon to right of center, viewed from north

== See also ==
- Geology of Utah
