= Nefertiti (disambiguation) =

Nefertiti (c. 1370 BC – c. 1330 BC) was the Great Royal Wife of Egyptian pharaoh Akhenaten.

Nefertiti may also refer to:

== Art, entertainment, and media ==
=== Film ===
- Nefertiti, Queen of the Nile (1961), an Italian sword-and-sandal historical drama by Fernando Cerchio
- Nefertiti, figlia del sole (1994), an Italian film directed by Guy Gilles

=== Music ===
- Nefertiti (Andrew Hill album), a 1976 album by Andrew Hill
- Nefertiti (Miles Davis album), a 1968 album by Miles Davis
  - "Nefertiti", a composition by Wayne Shorter featured on the Miles Davis album
- Nefertiti, the Beautiful One Has Come, a 1963 album by the Cecil Taylor Unit

== Other ==
- Nefertiti A. Walker, American college basketball player and Interim Vice Chancellor at the Isenberg School of Management
- Nefertiti (daughter of Horemakhet), Ancient Egyptian noblewoman
- Nefertiti piercing, a form of female genital piercing
- Queen Nefertiti Rock, a sandstone pillar in Arches National Park, USA
- 3199 Nefertiti

== See also ==
- Nefertari, Great Royal Wife of Ramesses the Great
- 1068 Nofretete, a minor planet orbiting the Sun
