= Isenberg School of Management =

Business school at the University of Massachusetts Amherst

University of Massachusetts Amherst Isenberg School of Management
- Type: Public business school
- Established: 1947; 79 years ago
- Parent institution: University of Massachusetts Amherst
- Accreditation: AACSB International; ACPHA
- Endowment: $116.94 million (2025) (Note: As of the year 2025, the total endowment of the business school is $116.94 million. The figures are from Isenberg School's Dean's Report 2025.)
- Dean: Anne P. Massey
- Students: 6,347
- Undergraduates: 4,000+
- Postgraduates: 1,700+
- Location: Amherst, Massachusetts, United States
- Campus: Suburban
- Alumni: 48,000+
- Colors
- Website: isenberg.umass.edu
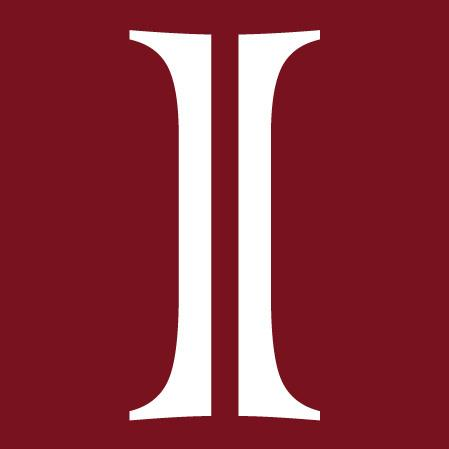

The Isenberg School of Management is the business school and also the second largest school at the University of Massachusetts Amherst, the flagship campus for the University of Massachusetts system. The Isenberg School is accredited by the AACSB International and ACPHA.

The school offers seven undergraduate majors along with MS, MBA and Ph.D. programs. As of the 2014–2015 academic year, there were approximately 3500 undergraduate students and 1300 graduate students enrolled in the Isenberg School of Management. As of 2025, Isenberg School has more than 48,000 alumni worldwide across 80 countries.

== History ==
Business courses were first offered at the Massachusetts Agricultural College in the early years of the 20th century, expanding rapidly during the 1930s and 1940s in response to student demand. The college's board of trustees established the School of Business Administration in 1947, and within seven years, it was conferring graduate degrees, including doctorates after 1967.

In 1964, the school moved to its current building in the heart of the UMass Amherst campus. In 1983, the School of Business Administration changed its name to School of Management. In 1998 the Isenberg School of Management was named after Eugene Isenberg, the chairman and CEO of Nabors Industries, which at the time was a world leader in gas and petroleum drilling.

=== McCormack Department of Sport Management ===
In 2010, the department of sports studies was renamed as the McCormack Department of Sport Management after Mark McCormack, founder and CEO of IMG. The McCormack family gifted $1.5 million to endow educational initiatives including the Executive-in-Residence program and an international travel and exchange program.

=== Marriott Center for Hospitality Management ===
In 2007, 200 seat Marriott dining $6.3 million facility named in honor of J. Willard Marriott and Alice Marriott was opened at University Campus Center. The facility has two state-of-the-art commercial production and demonstration kitchen-classrooms for Hospitality & Tourism Management students.

=== Modern expansion ===
The expanded building around the north and northeast ends of the business school built by Bjarke Ingels Group.

The business school completed and opened a 70,000-square-foot expansion in 2019. The project was estimated at $62 million and added classrooms, labs, and student-facing spaces.

== Programs ==
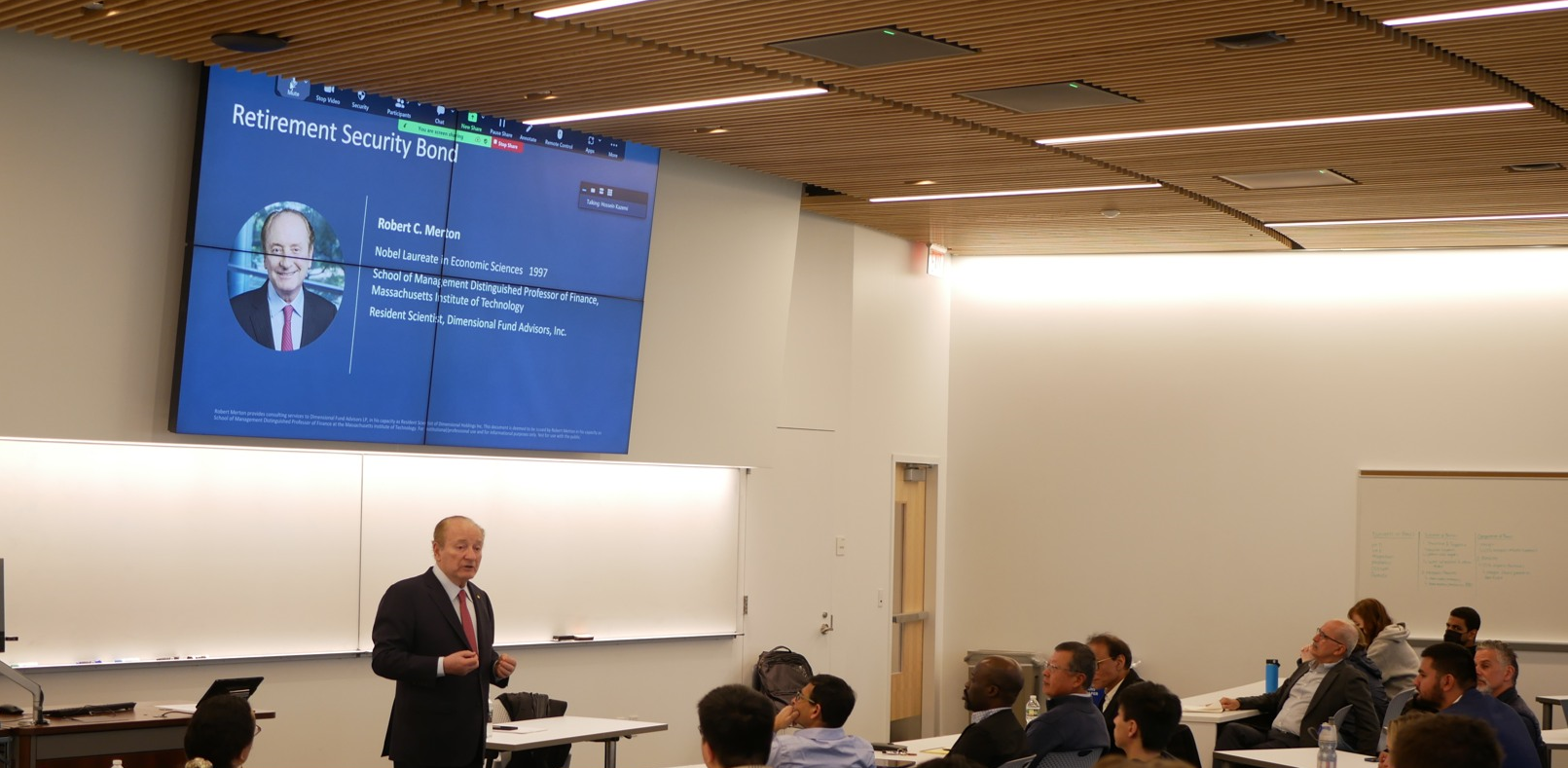
Nobel laureate Robert C. Merton at the Isenberg School for 2023 CISDM Conference.

In 2015, the business school became a signatory and participates in Principles for Responsible Management Education.

=== Undergraduate program ===
Isenberg awards Bachelor of Business Administration in five majors and Bachelor of Science in two majors. The finance undergraduate degree is affiliated with CFA Institute. The acceptance rate to BBA program was 5% to 10% for internal students. From fall 2022, the school stopped internal transfers who were not directly accepted into the program.

=== MBA and masters program ===
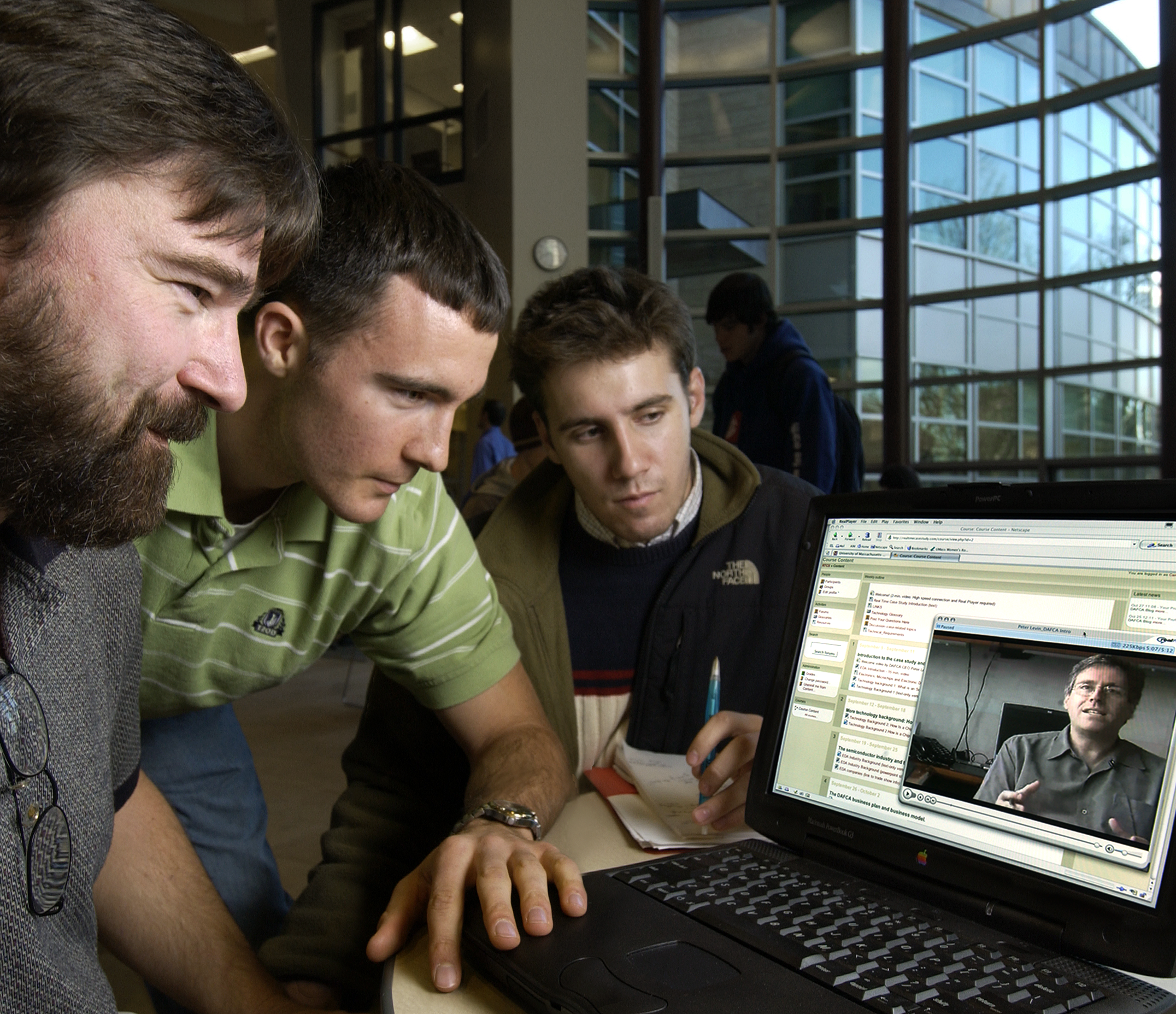
Students at the Isenberg School.

Isenberg offers full-time, part-time and online programs for its AACSB-accredited MBA degree. The school has the second largest MBA degree program in the Commonwealth of Massachusetts by total enrolled students.

Isenberg offers Dual MBA/MS degrees in six disciplines: Public Policy and Administration, Sport Management, Civil Engineering, Environmental Engineering, Industrial Engineering, and Mechanical Engineering. Isenberg also awards M.S. degrees in Accounting and Sport Management.

== Rankings ==
=== Undergraduate level ===
In 2024, U.S. News & World Report ranked undergraduate program 47th in the United States. and 29th among public universities.

=== Graduate level ===
At the MBA level, in 2020 and 2023 U.S. News & World Report ranked Isenberg 53rd overall, and ranked its online MBA program 28th. Financial Times has ranked its online MBA program at 3rd worldwide and 1st in the United States for the years 2017, 2018, 2019, and 2020. In 2023, Financial Times has ranked its online MBA program at 5th worldwide and 2nd in the United States.

=== Individual departments ===
In 2019, Public Accounting Report’s Annual Professors Survey has ranked the college under top 30 for undergraduate, graduate, and Ph.D. accounting programs.

In 2022, the McCormack Department of Sport Management has been ranked #1 graduate-level global sports management program for the fourth time in the world by SportBusiness International. In 2014, Forbes called the sports management department "a world-wide leader in its field".

== Publications ==
The Journal of Alternative Investments is housed and managed by the Center for International Securities and Derivatives Markets (CISDM).

== Centers ==
- Berthiaume Center for Entrepreneurship (Note: In 2014, alumni Douglas and Diana Berthiaume donated $10 million to the university to establish Berthiaume Center for Entrepreneurship. and further in 2023, they donated $20 million to support and expand faculty research and endow new faculty positions and professorships.)
- Business Communication Center
- Center for International Securities and Derivatives Markets - CISDM-Morningstar Hedge Fund Database tracks more than 7,000 hedge funds, commodity trading advisors, and funds of funds. The business school is the co-founder of Chartered Alternative Investment Analyst.
- Massachusetts Small Business Development Center
- McCormack Center for Sport Research & Education
- Virtual Center for Supernetworks

== Student life ==
The Isenberg School has 42 independent undergraduate student organizations. The Isenberg Undergraduate Student Advisory Council (IUSAC) serves as a voice for undergraduate students in the business school and also works to strengthen the connection between students and the school administration and fosters leadership development among students.

The school has an MBA Oath Ceremony, where graduating MBA students voluntarily pledge to "create value responsibly and ethically". The first year undergraduate students take Isenberg Pledge.

== Incidents ==
Student Eric Tarpinian-Jachym at Isenberg, who was interning at United States Capitol for Ron Estes, was struck in a triple shooting and gunfire in June 2025, and died later at the hospital. This crime was cited by President Donald Trump in announcing a law-enforcement surge in Washington.

== Notable alumni ==
=== Business ===
- Anshu Jain (1985), former Global co-CEO of Deutsche Bank
- Marc Forgione, owner of restaurant Marc Forgione in New York City
- John F. Smith, Jr. (1960), former CEO and chairman of General Motors Corporation
- Vivek Paul, Former President and Vice Chairman of Wipro Limited
- James Pallotta (1979), President of A.S. Roma and chairman and managing director of Raptor Group
- Jeff Taylor 2001, founder of Monster.com
- John Legere, CEO and President of T-Mobile US
- Earl W. Stafford, founder of the Stafford Foundation

=== Government ===
- Hina Rabbani Khar (2001), 30th Foreign Minister of Pakistan
- V. Anantha Nageswaran, 18th Chief Economic Adviser to the Government of India
- Rudolf Rodríguez, former Minister of Finance and Public Credit of Colombia

=== Academics ===
- Susan Fournier, Dean of Questrom School of Business
- David Fubini (1976), Senior Lecturer at Harvard Business School
- Müjde Yüksel, Associate Professor at Suffolk University
- Dennis Hanno, President of Wheaton College

=== Sports and athletics ===
- Serena Williams, tennis player
- James Marcou, Assistant coach of Harvard Crimson men's ice hockey
- Jay Monahan, 4th Commissioner of the PGA Tour
- Li Li Leung (2003), President and CEO of USA Gymnastics
- Tony Barbee (1993), collegiate basketball coach at Auburn University
- Ben Cherington (1997), Former executive Vice President and General Manager of the Boston Red Sox
- Dave Jauss, baseball coach
- Neal Huntington (1992), General Manager of the Pittsburgh Pirates
- Dave Littlefield (1984), Senior Vice President and General Manager of the Pittsburgh Pirates
- Mike Tannenbaum (1991), former general manager of the New York Jets
- Adam Breneman, NFL player and commentator

=== Medicine ===
- J. Michael Millis, Professor of Surgery and Vice Chair of Global Surgery at University of Chicago.

=== Armed forces and police ===
- Robert I. Miller, 24th Surgeon General of the United States Air Force and United States Space Force
- John B. Hall Jr. (1967), Commander of Fifth Air Force and United States Forces Japan
- Lee E. Payne, Major General in the US Air Force
- Samantha Sepulveda - Long Island police officer

=== Arts and entertainment ===
- Julie Robenhymer, former Miss New Jersey

=== Honorary alumni ===
- Wayne Chang (Hon. D.B.), co-founder of Crashlytics

== Notable faculty ==
=== Tenured faculty, endowed professors and chairs ===
- Javier Reyes, Professor of Finance and Chancellor
- Nefertiti Walker, Associate Professor
- Thomas Schneeweis, retired Michael and Cheryl Philipp Professor of Finance
- Sheila Bair, retired visiting professor of finance, Chair Board of directors of Fannie Mae
- Hossein Kazemi, Michael and Cheryl Philipp Professor of Finance
- Anna Nagurney, John F. Smith Memorial Professor of Operations Management
- Linda Smircich, Professor of Management

=== Executive-in-Residence ===
- David Stern, 4th Commissioner of the National Basketball Association
- Val Ackerman, 1st President of the Women's National Basketball Association
- Stacey Allaster, Former CEO of Women's Tennis Association
- Anita DeFrantz, member of the International Olympic Committee
- Sean McManus, Former President of CBS Sports
- George Bodenheimer, Former President of ESPN.
- DeMaurice Smith, Former executive director of the National Football League Players Association
- Bernie Mullin, Former CEO of Atlanta Spirits
- Jon Spoelstra, author, sports marketer
- Harry Edwards, sociologist
- Sonny Vaccaro, innovator

== See also ==
- List of United States graduate business school rankings
- List of business schools in the United States
- List of AACSB-accredited schools (accounting)
