= Acacia blaxellii =

Blaxell's wattle

Scientific classification
- Kingdom: Plantae
- Clade: Tracheophytes
- Clade: Angiosperms
- Clade: Eudicots
- Clade: Rosids
- Order: Fabales
- Family: Fabaceae
- Subfamily: Caesalpinioideae
- Clade: Mimosoid clade
- Genus: Acacia
- Species: A. blaxellii

Binomial name
- Acacia blaxellii Maslin

Synonyms
- Racosperma blaxelli (Maslin) Pedley

Species of legume

Acacia blaxellii, also known as Blaxell's wattle, is a species of flowering plant in the family Fabaceae and is endemic to inland areas of the south-west of Western Australia. It is a spreading, dense shrub with narrowly oblong to oblong phyllodes, spherical heads of golden-yellow flowers, and thinly leathery, wavy to ring-shaped or S-shaped pods.

== Description ==
Acacia blaxellii is a dense, spreading shrub that typically grows to a 0.3–1.2 m (1 ft 0 in – 3 ft 11 in) high and up to 2 m (6 ft 7 in) wide and has densely hairy branchlets. Its phyllodes are more or less erect, straight and narrowly oblong to oblong, thick and fleshy, 10–20 mm (0.39–0.79 in) long and 3–5 mm (0.12–0.20 in) wide and glabrous except at the base. The flowers are borne in two spherical heads on a peduncle 7–22 mm (0.28–0.87 in) long, each head 3.5–4.5 mm (0.14–0.18 in) in diameter with 17 to 31 golden-yellow flowers. Flowering has been recorded from August to October, and the pods are glabrous, thinly leathery, wavy to ring-shaped or S-shaped up to 20 mm (0.79 in) long and 3.5–4.0 mm (0.14–0.16 in) wide, with broadly elliptic, glossy black seeds about 2 mm (0.079 in) long with a white, linear to club-shaped aril.

== Taxonomy ==
Acacia blaxellii was first formally described in 1999 by the botanist Bruce Maslin in the journal Nuytsia from specimens he collected 106 km (66 mi) south of Queen Victoria Rock on the road to Hyden. The specific epithet (blaxellii) honours Don Blaxell, who discovered the species.

== Distribution and habitat ==
This species of wattle grows in clay on flat land or in loam on low rocky hills, mainly between Frank Hann National Park and McDermid Rock about 100 km (62 mi) west of Norseman, but also near Hyden and Norseman, in the Coolgardie and Mallee bioregions in inland parts of the south-west of Western Australia.

== Conservation status ==
Acacia blaxellii is listed as "not threatened" by the Government of Western Australia Department of Biodiversity, Conservation and Attractions.

== See also ==
- List of Acacia species
