= Linda Smircich =

American business theorist

Linda Smircich (born 1948) is a Professor of Management in the Isenberg School of Management, University of Massachusetts Amherst where she teaches Organizational Alternative Paradigms. She is part of the critical management studies approach field and a critical researcher in organizational culture and gender.

== Early life ==
Linda Smircich earned a B.S. from State University of New York at Oswego, M.B.A. and Ph.D. from Syracuse University.

== Career ==
She served as Chair of the Management Department at the Isenberg School of Management at the University of Massachusetts Amherst.

== Research ==
Her research interests are in the fields of organizational behavior and theory; qualitative research, alternative paradigms; cultural perspectives on organizations and management; organization change; gender and organization, and feminist theory. She is pursuing a cultural and critical perspective on organization and management.

Her earlier scholarly writing were centered on organizational culture, Smircich's publications are often co-authored with Marta Calàs and apply insights from cultural studies, postmodernism, feminism, and post-colonial theory to analyze organizational topics such as leadership, business ethics, and globalization.

She is co-editor of the international, interdisciplinary journal Organization, together with Gibson Burrell, Marta Calàs, and Mike Reed.

== Recognition ==
- Outstanding College Teacher Award, 2009 Isenberg School of Management
- Distinguished PhD Alumni Award, 2008 Syracuse University Whitman School of Management
- Sage Award for Scholarly Contribution, 2006 Gender, Diversity & Organizations Division, Academy of Management

== Slected publications ==
=== Books ===
- (1992) Organizations as shared meanings
- (1992) Authenticity in the superior-subordinate relationship : its measurement and relationship to commitment, involvement, role clarity, influence style, and satisfaction
- (1993) Rewriting gender into organization theorizing
- (1995) Critical perspectives on organization and management
- (1997) Postmodern management theory
- (1999) From "the woman's" point of view, feminist approaches to organization studies with Marta B Calás

=== Articles ===
- Gareth Morgan and Linda Smircich (1980) The Case for Qualitative Research; The Academy of Management Review Vol. 5, No. 4 (Oct., 1980), pp. 491–500
- Linda Smircich and Gareth Morgan (1982). Leadership: The Management of Meaning. The Journal of Applied Behavioral Science, 18, 257-273. doi:10.1177/002188638201800303
- Linda Smircich (1983). Concepts of Culture and Organizational Analysis. Administrative Science Quarterly, 28(3): 339-358.
- M. B. Calas and Linda Smircich (2014) Engendering the Organizational: Organization Studies and Feminist Theorizing. In P. Adler, P. du Gay, G. Morgan & M. Reed (Eds.) The Oxford Handbook of Sociology, Social Theory and Organization Studies: Contemporary Currents. London: Oxford University Press.
- M. B. Calas, L. Smircich, and E. Holvino (2014) Theorizing Gender- and Organization: Changing Times. ...Changing Theories? In S. Kumra, R. Simpson & R. Burke (Eds.) The Oxford Handbook of Gender in Organizations. London: Oxford University Press.
- M. B. Calas, H. Ou, and L. Smircich (2013) ’Woman‘ on the Move: Mobile Subjectivities after Intersectionality, Equality, Diversity and Inclusion.
