= Gareth Morgan (business theorist) =

British/Canadian organizational theorist (born 1943)

Gareth Morgan (born 22 December 1943) is a British/Canadian organizational theorist, management consultant.

He is a Distinguished Research Professor at York University in Toronto. He is known as creator of the "organisational metaphor" concept and writer of the 1979 book Sociological Paradigms and Organizational Analysis with Gibson Burrell and the 1986 best-seller Images of Organization.

== Biography ==
Born in Porthcawl, Wales, Morgan took his grammar school education in Bridgend, Wales and studied at the London School of Economics and Political Science, graduating with a BSc in economics. He then worked as an accountant in the British Public Service, becoming a Chartered Member of the Institute of Public Finance in 1968.

From there he moved to the University of Texas at Austin, graduating with an MA in Public Administration in 1970. This experience led to a change in career direction as a result of some classes in organisation science that helped him begin to see and challenge some of the assumptions underlying the accounting profession He pursued this direction as a lecturer at the University of Lancaster, receiving a PhD in Organization studies in 1980, and launching his career as a writer, public speaker and management consultant.

In the 1980s he became a faculty member at the Pennsylvania State University School of Business. Moving from there to York University in Toronto. In 1988 he was elected Life Fellow of the International Academy of Management in recognition of an outstanding international contribution to the science and art of management, and in 1992 was elected Distinguished Research Professor at York University. In the 1990s his book Images of Organization became a world-wide best-seller, translated into fifteen languages.

In the late 1990s Morgan turned to his attention to reinventing the teaching of organisation and management through the development and use of internet technologies. This led to the launch in 2000 of his company NewMindsets Inc, and his research and activities as an internet entrepreneur.

At various times, he has served on the editorial boards of several leading academic journals including Action Learning, Administration & Society, Organization, Journal of Management, and Organization Studies.

He has been elected Associate Fellow at the Said Business School, Oxford University (December 2014); was awarded, with Gibson Burrell, the Academy of Management Trailblazer Award for his contributions to organization and management theory (August 2014), and received an honorary doctorate (dr.phil.h.c) from Syddansk Universitet (University of Southern Denmark), October 2014.

== Work ==
Throughout his career Morgan has sought to integrate theory and practice, writing for both academic and practitioner audiences, and has been a strong advocate of action learning as a strategy for generating effective research. The common theme uniting his work is that of challenging assumptions – to help develop new ways of thinking in social research, organisation and management theory and practice, and, by implication, in everyday life.

Morgan is known for his writings on management, social theory and research methodology, especially through his books Sociological Paradigms and Organizational Analysis written with Gibson Burrell and Beyond Method: Strategies for Social Research.

=== Sociological Paradigms and Organizational Analysis, 1979 ===
This 1979 book by Gibson Burrell and Gareth Morgan is now regarded as a classic text on organisation theory. Building on Thomas Kuhn's concept of paradigm, it explores the hidden assumptions of social and organizational theory, offering a map-like representation of dozens of different schools of thought. The fundamental thesis is that different theories reflect very different implicit assumptions on the nature of social reality.

The Burrell and Morgan map contrasts the assumptions of "Functionalist", "Interpretive", "Radical Humanist" and "Radical Structuralist" paradigms, showing how these assumptions influence our perceptions and the ways we look at organisations. Ever since its publication in 1979 it has been used by numerous scholars – in a wide variety of disciplines – to challenge the fundamental theories and assumptions shaping their work.

=== Beyond Method: Strategies for Social Research, 1983 ===
Published in 1983, this book builds on the framework offered in Sociological Paradigms and Organizational Analysis, contrasting the assumptions and approaches of fourteen different research methodologies. Morgan invited a range of collaborators who were leading exponents of the different methodologies to outline their fundamental assumptions and how these assumptions get translated into a particular methodological approach.

After illustrating the methods e.g. positivist, interpretive, critical, transformational, radical and class-based, Morgan explores their similarities, differences and contradictory nature. This leads him to his view of "research as conversation" which, like all conversations, he contends, should be open to different voices. In this way he seeks to advance the cause of an open and reflective social science capable of exploring the multiple dimensions of social life.

=== Images of Organization, 1986 ===
In the 1980s in organizational studies an "increasing attention has been devoted to understanding how the assumptions which scientists bring to their subject of investigation". To ground this concept, Morgan introduces "Imaginization" as a new way of thinking and organising. In his book Images of Organization Morgan introduces the use of metaphors to understand and deal with organisation problems, describing the organisation as:

1. machines,
2. organisms,
3. brains,
4. cultures,
5. political systems,
6. psychic prisons,
7. flux and transformation, and
8. instruments of domination.

These metaphors are not meant to be exhaustive and he acknowledges that they can be used individually or in combination to guide our understanding of organisations and organisation problems. His aim is to show how metaphor is central to our thinking about organisation and management and open new possibilities. This is further explored in Morgan's book Imaginization: New Mindsets for Seeing, Thinking and Managing.

=== Riding the Waves of Change, 1988 ===
This 1988 book is based on the findings of an action-learning project where senior executives explored the implications of key environmental trends for the future of their organisations. Core competencies discussed include:

- Reading the Environment
- Managing Proactively
- Sharing the Vision
- Empowering Human Resources
- Promoting Creativity, Learning and Innovation
- Developing Skills in Remote Management
- Harnessing the Creative Power of Information Technologies
- Managing Complexity and Ambiguity
- Reframing Contexts

The research was conducted in the 1980s and the book is written largely through the words of the senior executives involved in the research study.

=== Imaginization: New Mindsets for Seeing, Organizing and Managing, 1993 ===
In Imaginization: New Mindsets for Seeing, Organizing and Managing (1993) Morgan introduces his concept of "Imaginization" and the interconnection between thinking and acting in organizational life. He argues that an understanding of the concept:

- Helps us find new ways of organising
- Improves our abilities to see and understand situations in new ways
- Promotes the creation of shared understandings
- Helps personal empowerment
- Develops capacities for continuous self-organization

The book presents case studies and illustrations on the above topics. The aim is to provide a practical guide that shows how to put "out of the box" thinking into practice, and develop new ways of organising that remain open, energised, and empowered in the face of constant change

== Publications ==
- Gibson Burrell and Gareth Morgan (1979) Sociological Paradigms and Organizational Analysis, London and Exeter: NH. Heinemann.
- Louis Pondy, Peter Frost, Gareth Morgan and Tom Dandridge (eds) (1983) Organizational Symbolism, Greenwich, CT: JAI Press.
- Gareth Morgan (ed.) (1983) Beyond Method: Strategies for Social Research, Newbury Park, CA: Sage Publications.
- Gareth Morgan (1986, 1997, 2006) Images of Organization, Newbury Park, CA: Sage Publications.
- Gareth Morgan. (1988) Riding the Waves of Change, San Francisco, CA: Jossey Bass.
- Gareth Morgan (1989) Creative Organization Theory: A Resourcebook, Newbury Park, CA: Sage Publications.
- Gareth Morgan (1989) Teaching Organization Theory: An Instructor's Manual, Newbury Park, CA: Sage Publications.
- Gareth Morgan and Karen Morgan (1991) Beyond the Glitterspeak: Creating Genuine Collaboration In Our Schools, Ontario Teachers Federation.
- Gareth Morgan (1993) Imaginization: New Mindsets for Seeing, Organizing and Managing, Newbury Park and San Francisco, CA: Sage Publications.
