= Gibson Burrell =

British sociologist and organisational theorist

Gibson Burrell (born 1948) is a British sociologist and organizational theorist, Professor of Organisation Theory at University of Manchester, Honorary Professor at the University of York, and formerly the University of Leicester. He became known as writer of the 1979 book Sociological Paradigms and Organizational Analysis with Gareth Morgan, and is recognized for introducing the critical management project to the University of Leicester.

== Life and work ==
Burrell studied sociology at the University of Leicester, where in 1974 he also completed his M.Phil. In 1980 he received his PhD at the University of Manchester.

Burrell started his academic career as researcher at the University of Birmingham. In the late 1970s he was appointed Lecturer in the Department of Behaviour in Organizations at the University of Lancaster. In the mid-1980s he was appointed Professor of Organizational Behaviour at the University of Warwick. In 2002 he was appointed Professor of Organisation Theory at University of Leicester, where he headed its School of Management from 2002 to 2007. According to the Carter / Mueller Dean index, Burrell ranks as the best Dean in the UK over the last two decades.

Burrell is founding co-editor of the international, interdisciplinary journal Organization, together with Linda Smircich, Marta Calàs, and Mike Reed.

In 2005 Burrell was elected an Academician for the Social Sciences (AcSS), and in 2014, with Gareth Morgan, he was awarded the Academy of Management Trailblazer Award for his contributions to organization and management theory. In 2021, he was awarded the Richard Whipp Lifetime Achievement Award from the British Academy of Management.

In 2021, Burrell was announced as one of the 16 staff made redundant at the University of Leicester. "The stated purpose of the reorganization is a proposed disinvestment from ‘critical management studies and political economy’ in order to refocus research expertise on data analytics, entrepreneurship, innovation, operations and logistics, with 6 new appointments to be made in these areas, by those using, we are told, only quantitative skills."

== Publications, a selection ==
- Gibson Burrell and Gareth Morgan (1979) Sociological Paradigms and Organizational Analysis, London and Exeter: NH. Heinemann.
- Burrell, Gibson, and Jeff Hearn. The sexuality of organization. (1989).
- Burrell, Gibson. Pandemonium: Towards a retro-organization theory. Sage, 1997.
- Dale, Karen, and Gibson Burrell. The spaces of organisation and the organisation of space: Power, identity and materiality at work. Palgrave Macmillan, 2007.

Articles, a selection

- Burrell, Gibson. "Sex and organizational analysis." Organization Studies 5.2 (1984): 97–118.
- Cooper, Robert, and Gibson Burrell. "Modernism, postmodernism and organizational analysis: An introduction." Organization studies 9.1 (1988): 91–112.
- Burrell, Gibson. "Modernism, post modernism and organizational analysis 2: The contribution of Michel Foucault." Organization studies 9.2 (1988): 221–235.
- Burrell, Gibson. "Back to the future: time and organization." Rethinking Organization. New Directions in Organization Theory and Analysis (1992).
- Burrell, Gibson. "Discourses and Genealogies of Analysis." Studying organization: Theory and method (1999): 388.
