= Li Li Leung =

American businesswoman and former artistic gymnast

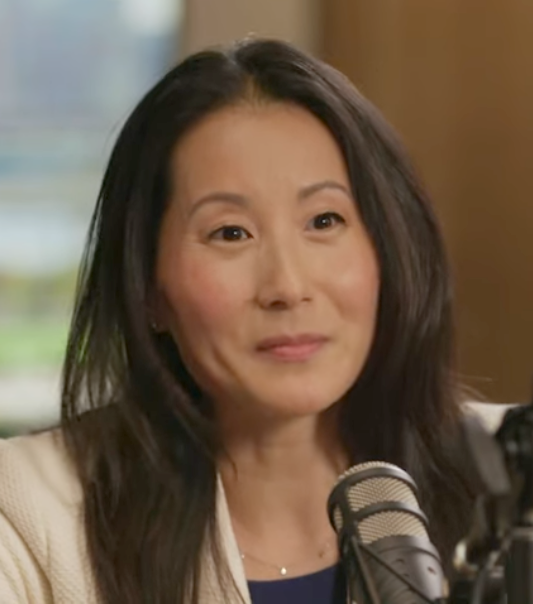
- In a 2025 interview
- Born: 1973 or 1974 (age 52–53); New Jersey, U.S.
- Education: University of Michigan (BA); Isenberg School of Management (MBA)
- Occupations: Businesswoman, gymnast

Li Li Leung (born c. 1973) is an American businesswoman and former artistic gymnast. She became the president and CEO of USA Gymnastics in February 2019. She was previously a vice president of the NBA.

== Early life and education ==
Leung began gymnastics training at the age of 7. In 1988, she participated in the 1988 Junior Pan American Games in Puerto Rico, where she placed third in the all-around in the youth division.

After her club competitive career, she attended the University of Michigan, where she competed for the Michigan Wolverines women's gymnastics team. At Michigan, she was a three-time All-Academic Big Ten Conference competitor. She graduated from Michigan in 1995 with a bachelor's degree in psychology. She later attended grad school at the University of Massachusetts at Amherst, where she received an MBA in Business and Sport Management in 2003 from the Isenberg School of Management.
