= Queen Victoria Rock =

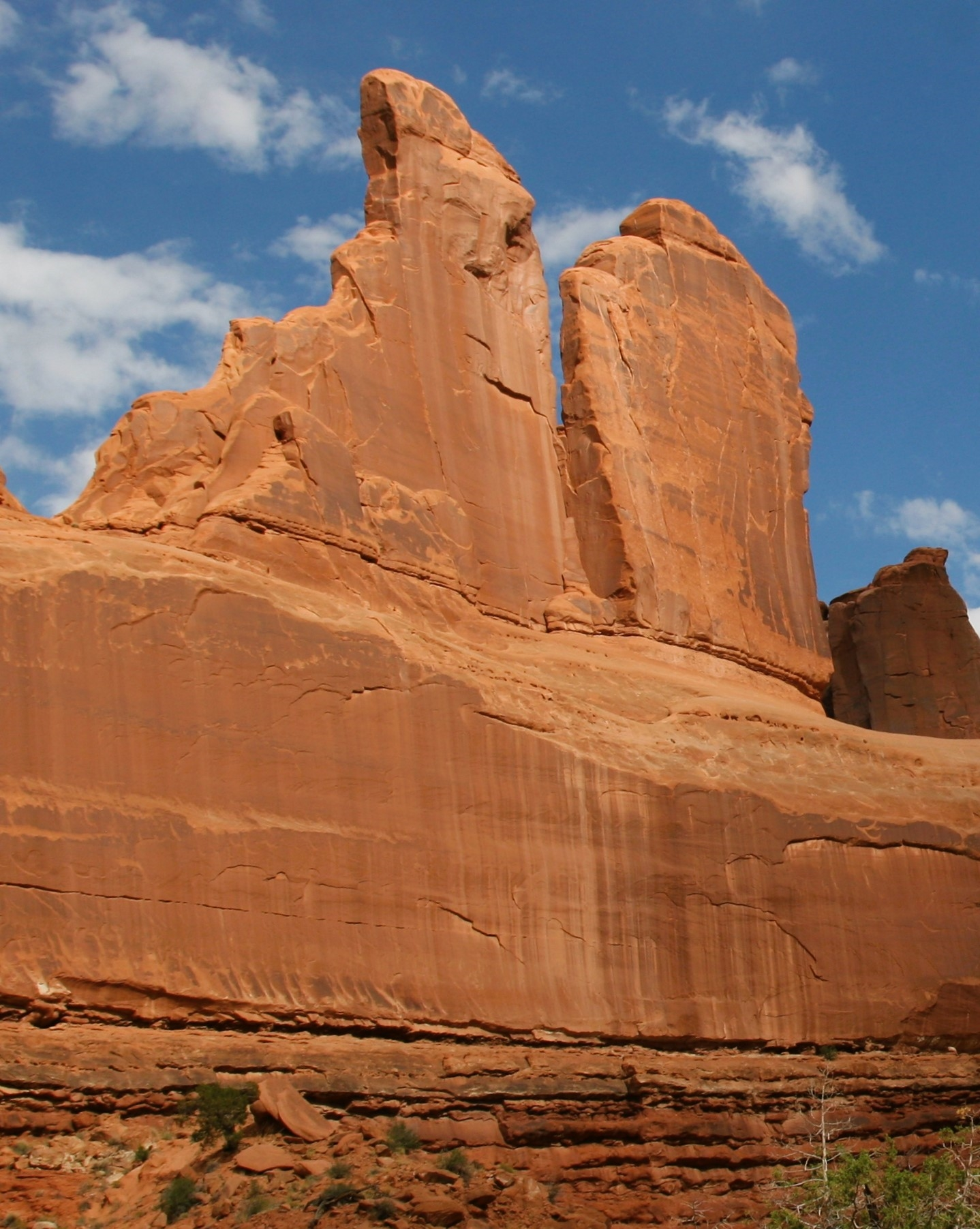
- West aspect

Highest point
- Elevation: 4,780 ft (1,457 m)
- Prominence: 120 ft (37 m)
- Isolation: 0.39 mi (0.63 km)
- Coordinates: 38°37′39″N 109°35′56″W

Naming
- Etymology: Queen Victoria

Geography
- Location within Utah Location within the United States
- Country: United States
- State: Utah
- County: Grand
- Protected area: Arches National Park
- Parent range: Colorado Plateau
- Topo map: USGS The Windows Section

Geology
- Rock age: Jurassic
- Rock type: Entrada Sandstone

Climbing
- First ascent: 1986

Queen Victoria Rock is a 4,780-foot-elevation (1,457-meter) pillar in Grand County, Utah, United States.

== Description ==
Queen Victoria Rock is located within Arches National Park and like many of the rock formations in the park, it is composed of Entrada Sandstone, specifically the Slick Rock Member overlaying the Dewey Bridge Member. Topographic relief is significant as the summit rises 400 feet (122 meters) above the Park Avenue Trail in 250 feet (76 meters) laterally. Precipitation runoff from Queen Victoria Rock drains to the nearby Colorado River via Courthouse Wash. This landform's descriptive toponym has been officially adopted by the United States Board on Geographic Names, and is so named because the feature resembles the profile of Queen Victoria sitting on a chair, although it may look more like Whistler's Mother. The first ascent of the summit was made in November 1986 by Charlie Fowler and Dan Grandusky via Dusty Shadows rock-climbing route (III, A-2+). Charlie Fowler and Alison Sheets also climbed the route, Queen For A Day, rated (I, A-2).

== Climate ==
According to the Köppen climate classification system, Queen Victoria Rock is located in a cold semi-arid climate zone with cold winters and hot summers. Spring and fall are the most favorable seasons to experience Arches National Park, when highs average 60 to 80 °F (15 to 25 °C) and lows average 30 to 50 °F (0 to 10 °C). Summer temperatures often exceed 100 °F (40 °C). Winters are cold, with highs averaging 30 to 50 °F (0 to 10 °C), and lows averaging 0 to 20 °F (−20 to −5 °C). As part of a high desert region, it can experience wide daily temperature fluctuations. The park receives an average of less than 10 inches (25 cm) of rain annually.

== Gallery ==
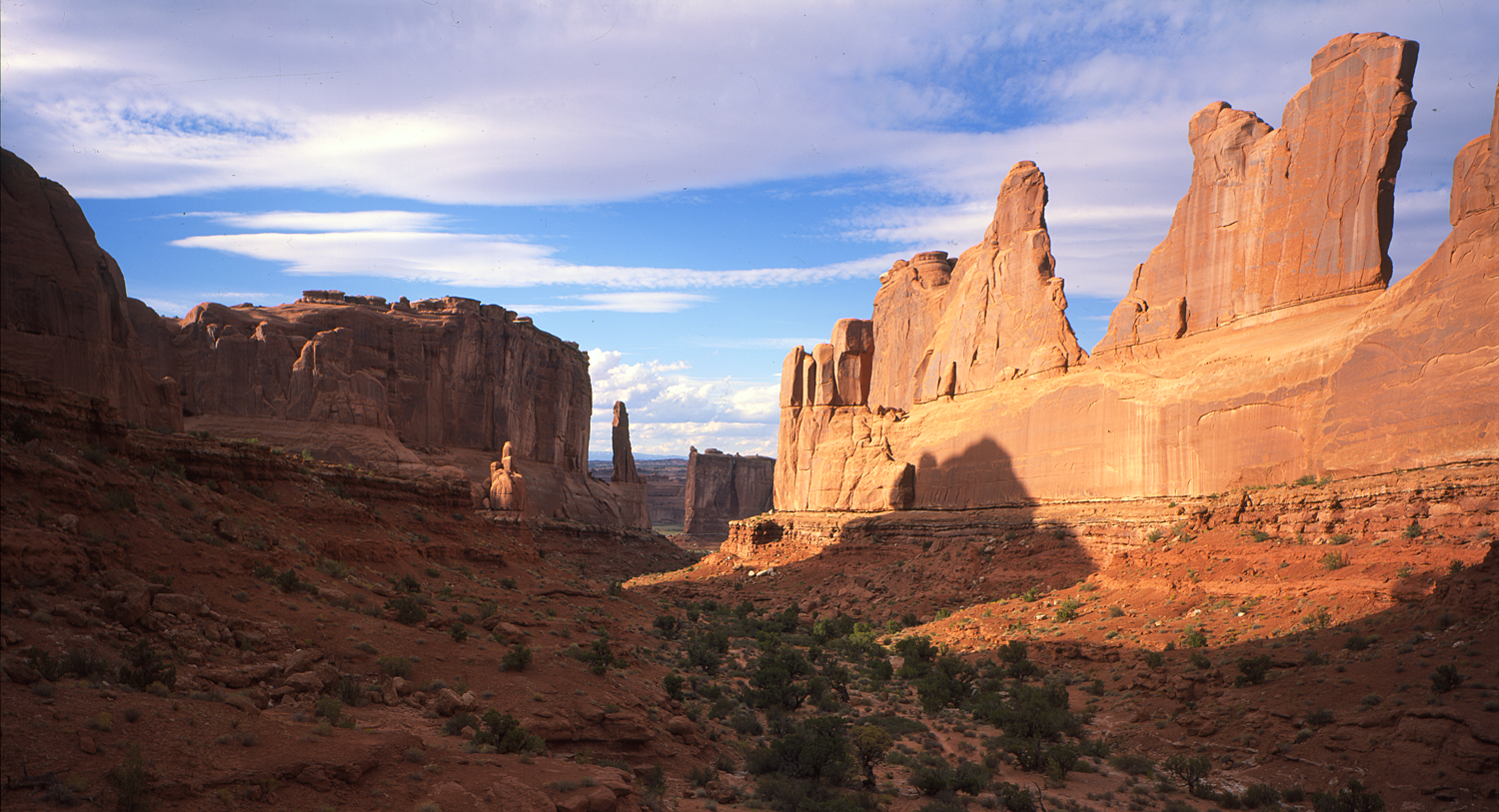
Park Avenue with Queen Victoria Rock in upper right corner

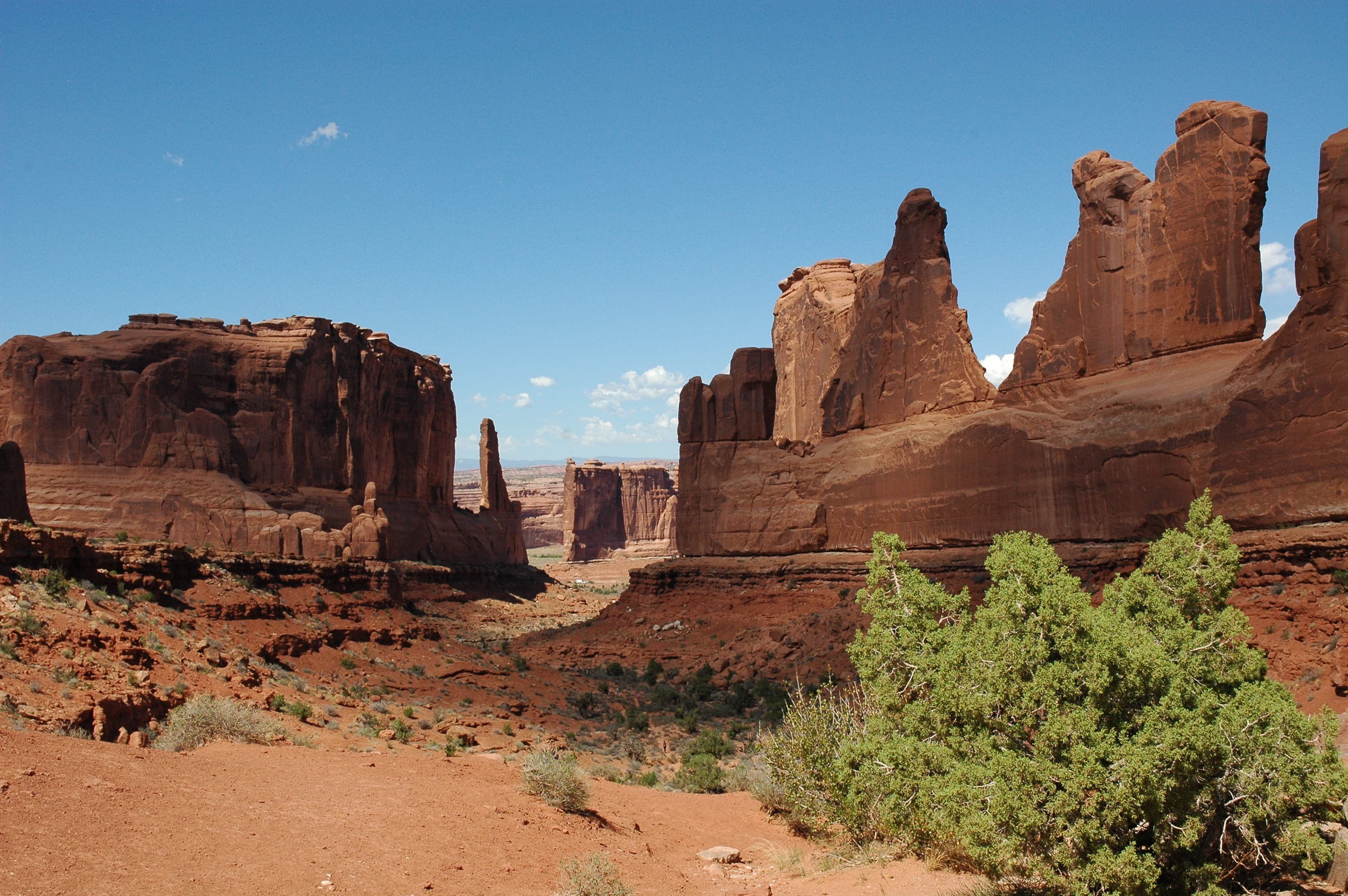
Park Avenue with Queen Victoria Rock in upper right corner

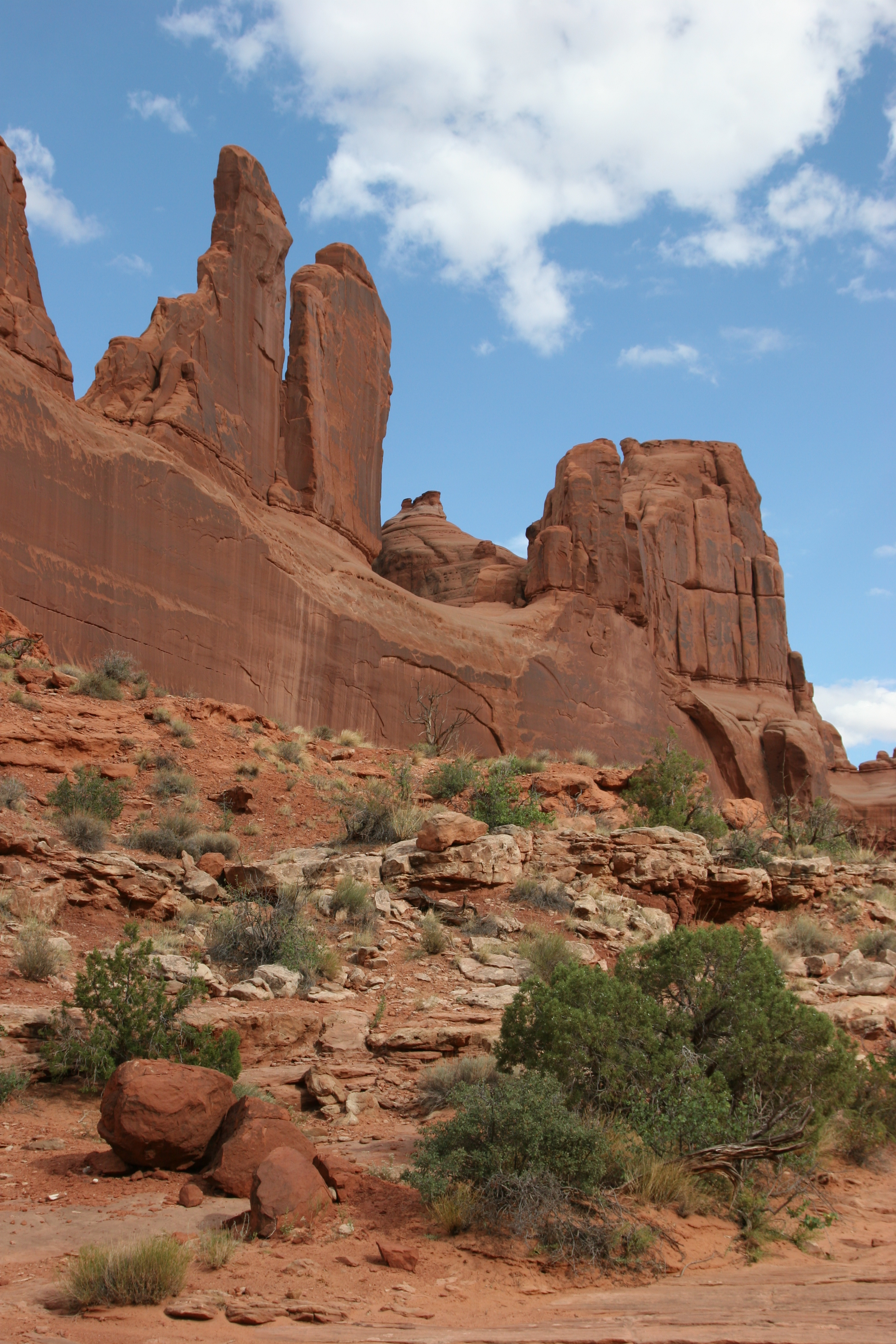
Queen Victoria Rock in upper left corner

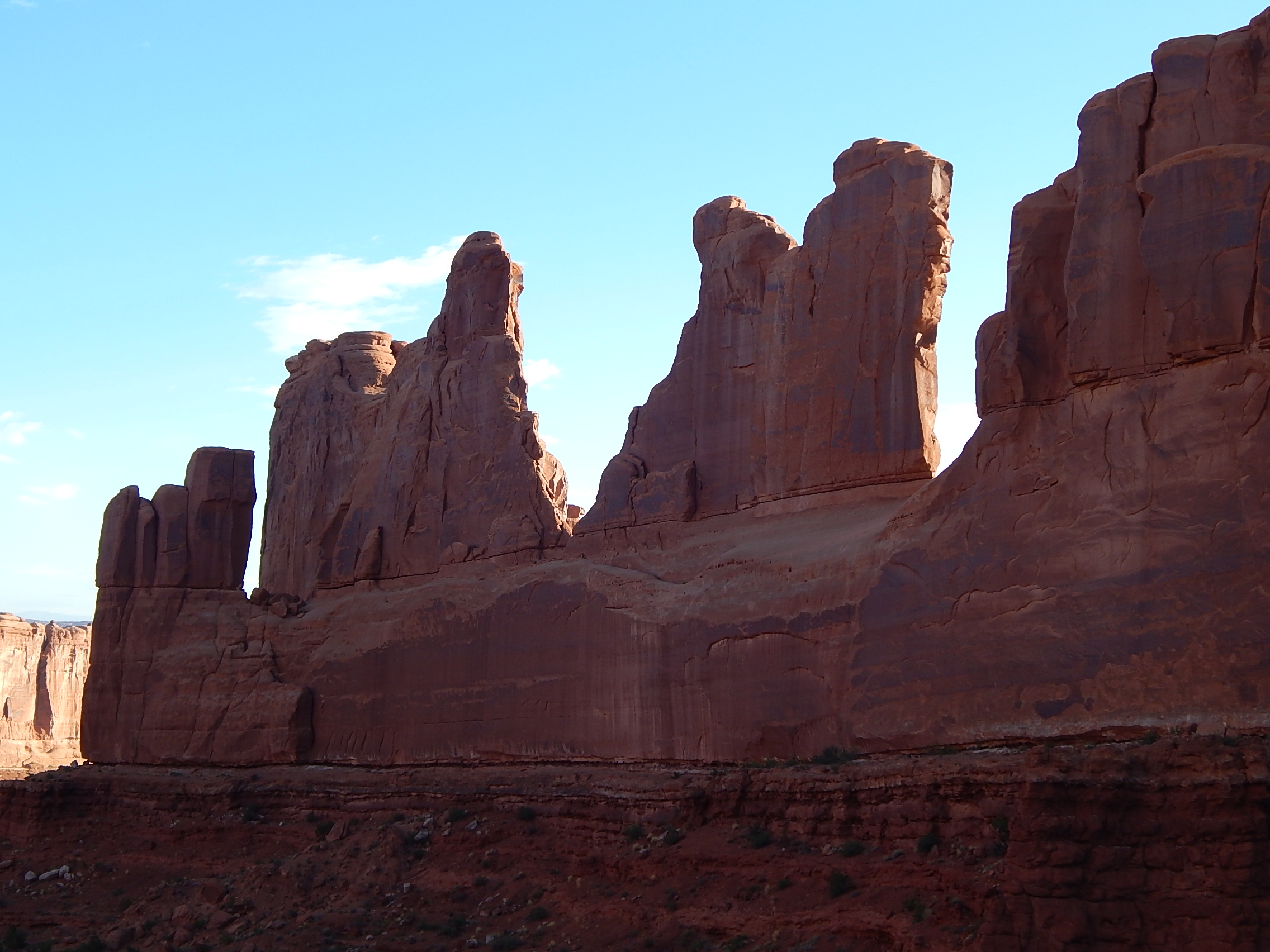
Queen Victoria Rock to right. The Candelabrum furthest to left.

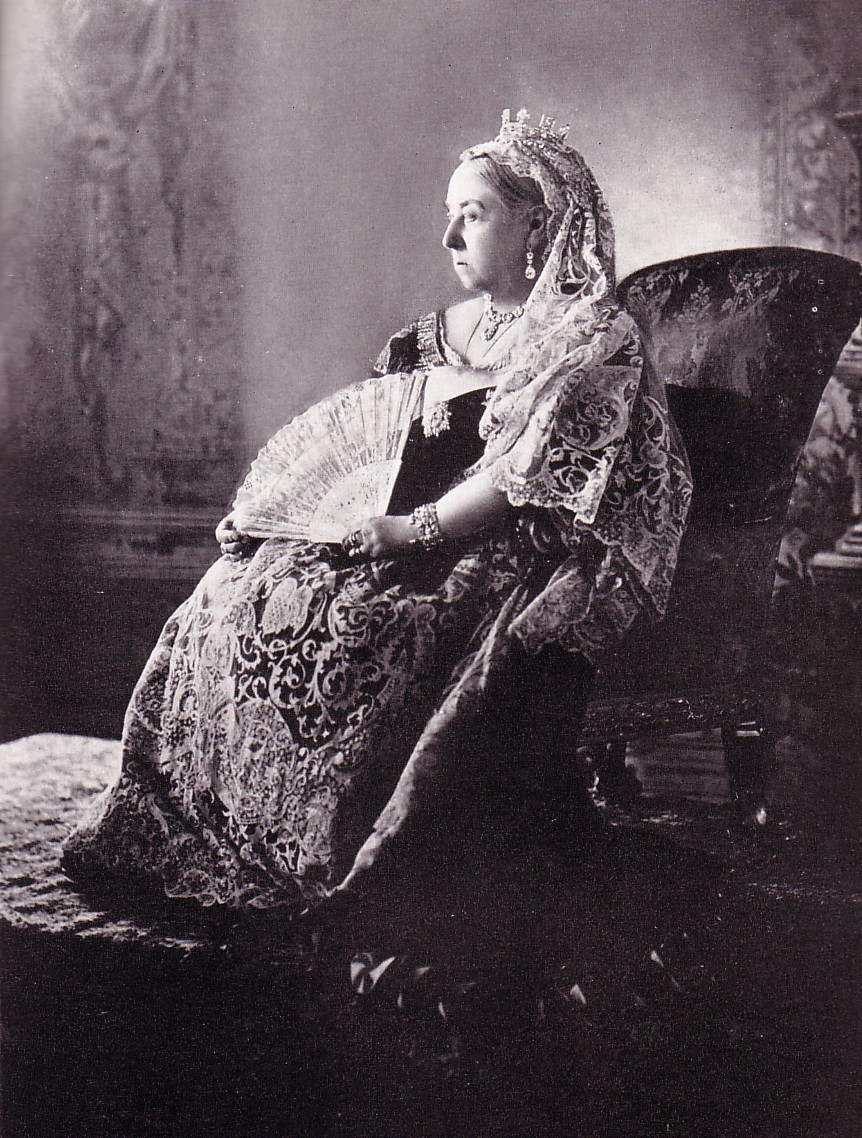
Queen Victoria for comparison to rock

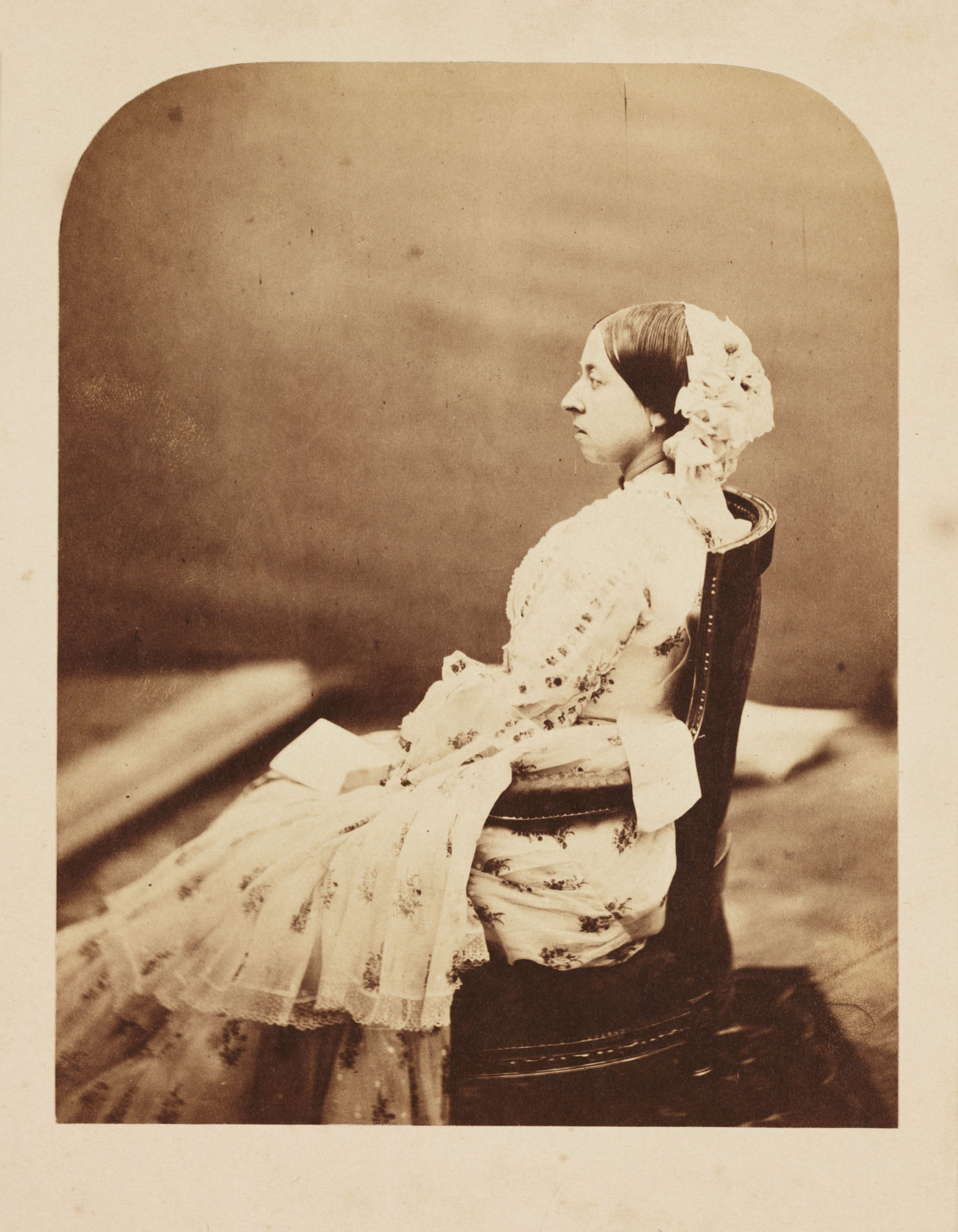
Queen Victoria for comparison to rock

Whistler's Mother for comparison to rock

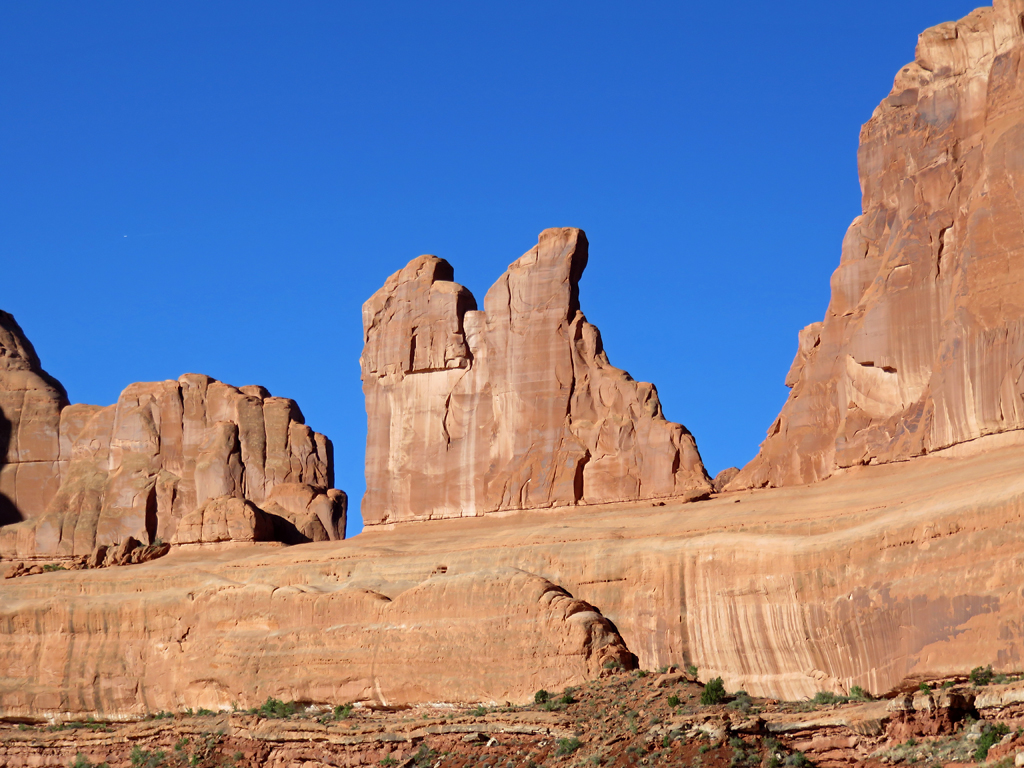
East aspect

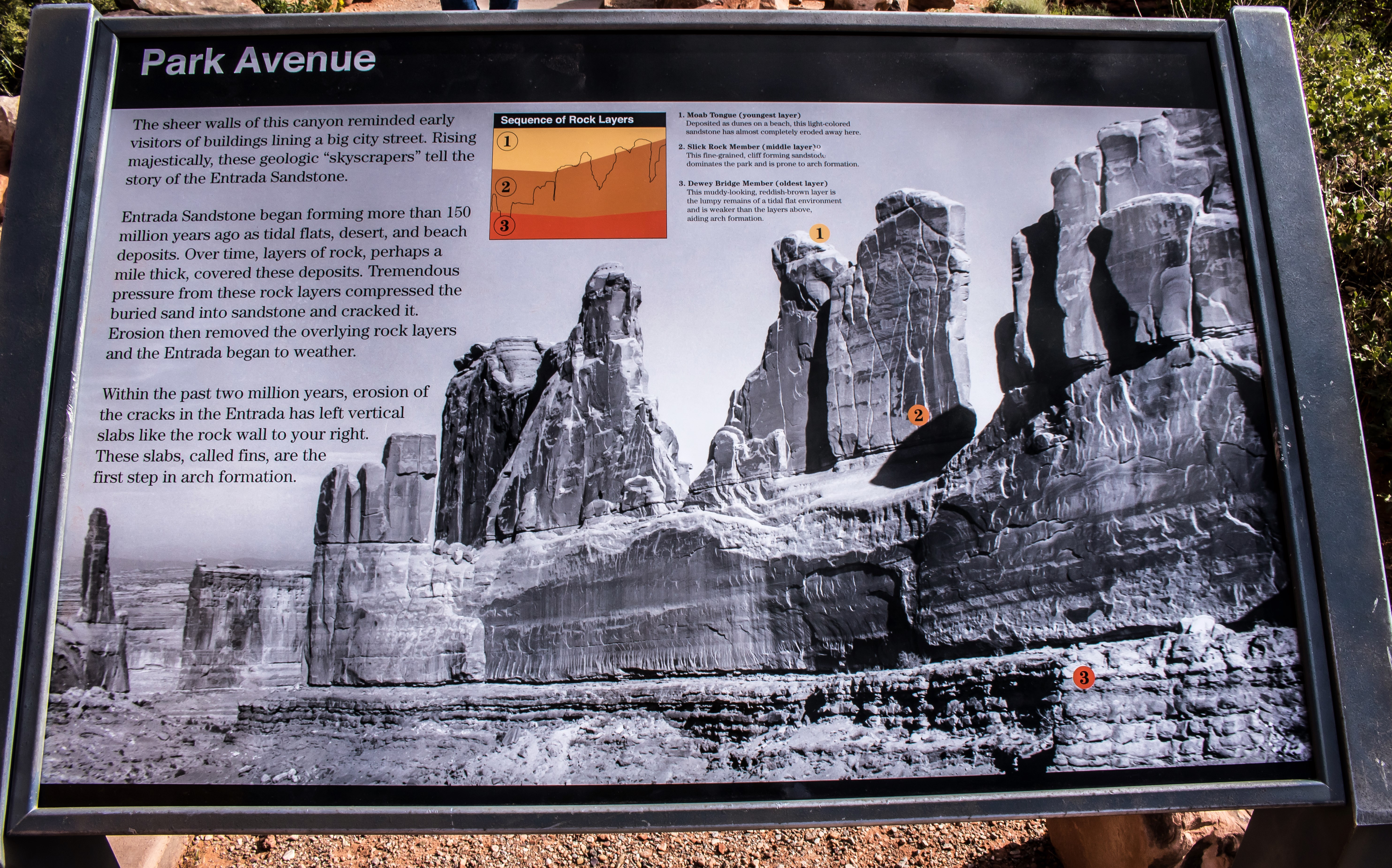
Interpretive sign showing sandstone strata on Queen Victoria Rock

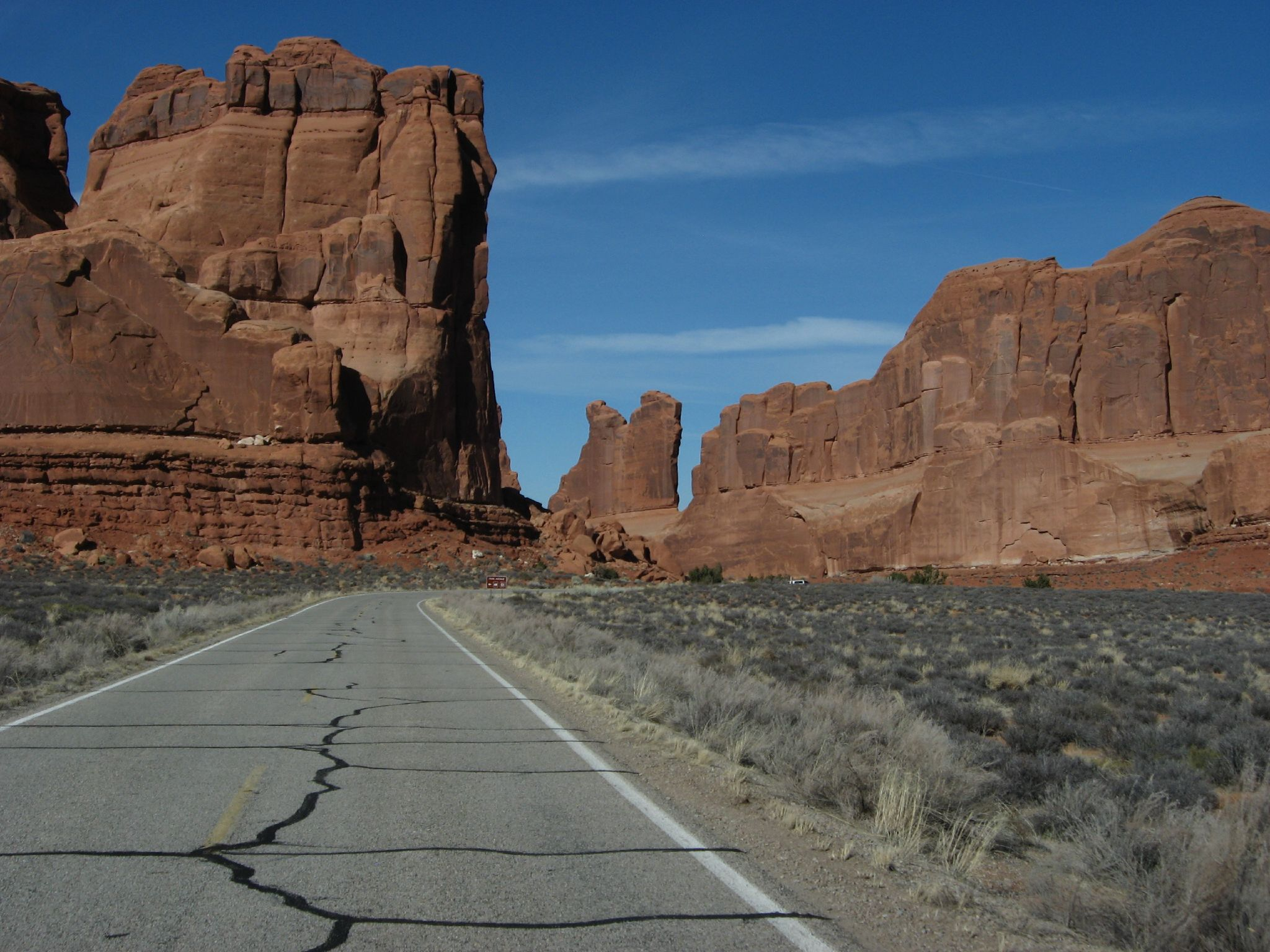
Queen Victoria Rock centered in the distance

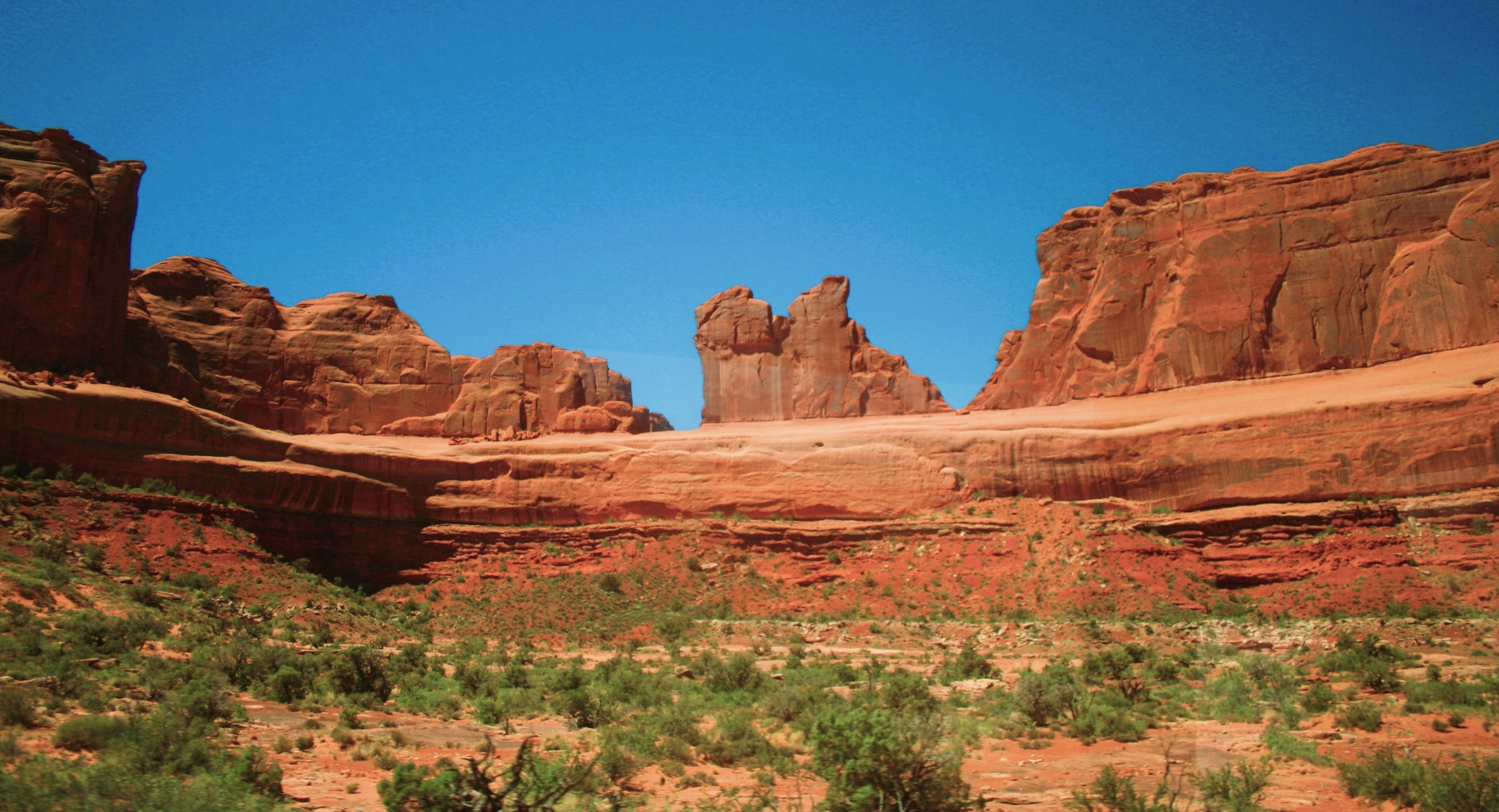
East aspect centered

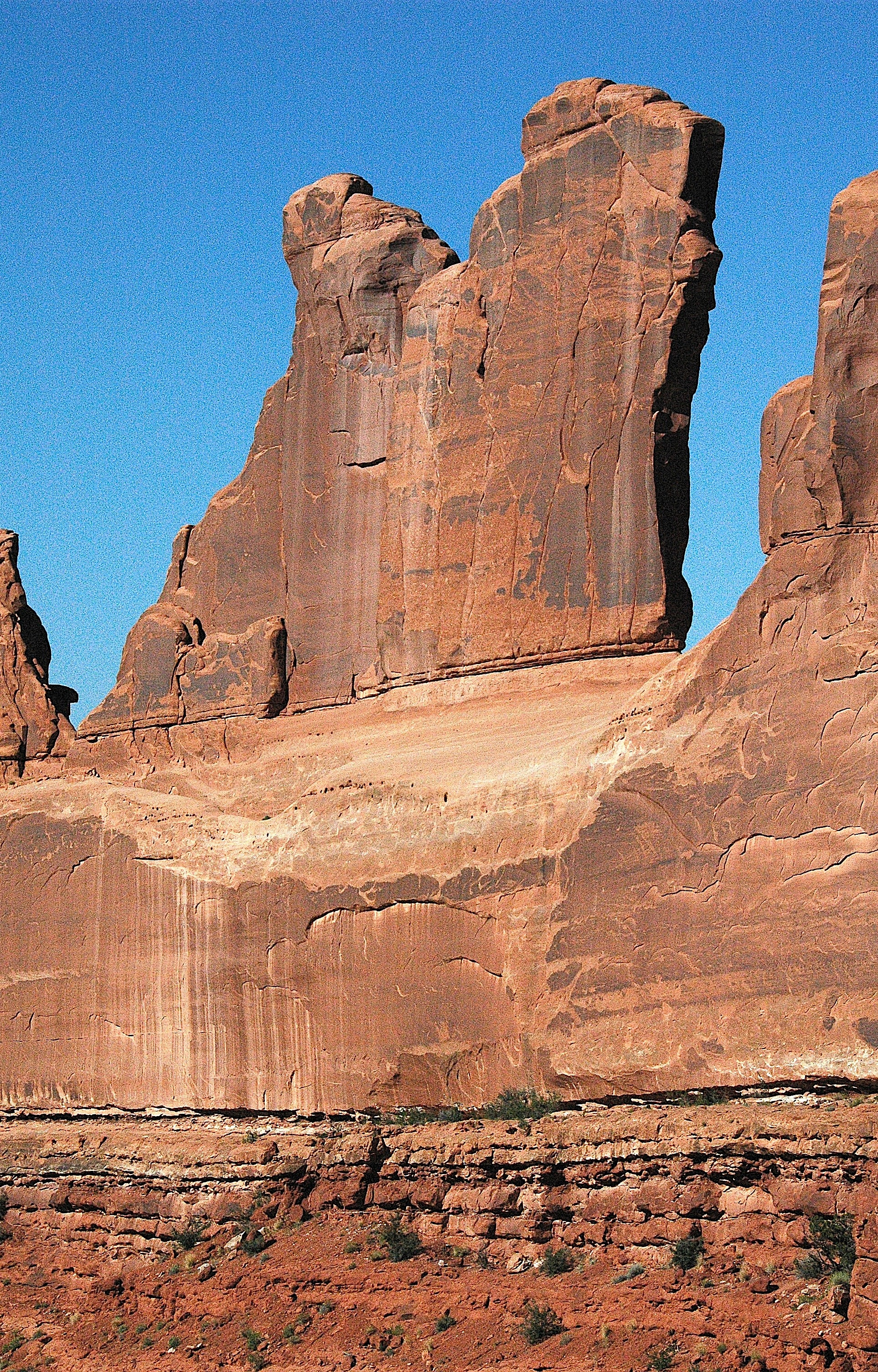

== See also ==
- Geology of Utah
- Queen Nefertiti Rock
