= Images of Organization =

Book by Gareth Morgan

- Book cover
- Author: Gareth Morgan
- Language: English
- Subject: Management, Organizational studies
- Genre: Nonfiction
- Publisher: Sage Publications
- Publication date: originally published in 1986
- Publication place: United States
- Pages: 520
- ISBN: 978-1-4129-3979-9

Images of Organization is a bestseller book by Gareth Morgan, professor of organizational behavior and industrial relations at the Schulich School of Business at York University in Toronto, which attempts to unveil organization via a number of metaphors. It was first published in 1986.

The book particularly describes the organization metaphorically as (1) machines, (2) organisms, (3) brains, (4) cultures, (5) political systems, (6) psychic prisons, (7) flux and transformation, and (8) instruments of domination.

== See also ==
- organizational culture – Customary behaviours in an organization
- organization theory – Sociological study of social organizations
