= 1988 Junior Pan American Artistic Gymnastics Championships =

International sports competition

Junior Pan American Artistic Gymnastics Championships
- Location: Ponce, Puerto Rico
- Date: July 1–9, 1988

The 1988 Junior Pan American Artistic Gymnastics Championships was held in Ponce, Puerto Rico, July 1–9, 1988.

== Medal summary ==
=== Junior division ===
| Event | Gold | Silver | Bronze |
|---|---|---|---|
Women
| Team | United States; Amy Myerson; Li Li Leung; Michelle Manzolillo | Canada; Leah Homma; Natasha Hallett; Koyuki Oka; Kelli Wolsey | Unknown |
| All Around | Leah Homma (CAN) | Amy Myerson (USA) | Li Li Leung (USA) |
| Vault | Unknown | Unknown | Luisa Parente (BRA) |
Men
| Team | United States; Kip Simons; Brad Hayashi; Khemarin Seng | Puerto Rico; Victor Colon; Pedro Tort; Ramon Rosado | Canada |
| All Around | Kip Simons (USA) | Brad Hayashi (USA) | Irano Carvalho (BRA) |
| Floor exercise | Kip Simons (USA) Irano Carvalho (BRA) | —N/a | Unknown |
| Pommel horse | Kip Simons (USA) | Unknown | Unknown |
| Rings | Kip Simons (USA) | Ramón Rosado (PUR) | Unknown |
| Vault | Victor Colon (PUR) | Ramón Rosado (PUR) | Brad Hayashi (USA) Gilberto Figueira (BRA) |
| Parallel bars | Kip Simons (USA) | Unknown | Irano Carvalho (BRA) |

=== Children's division ===
| Event | Gold | Silver | Bronze |
|---|---|---|---|
Women
| Team | United States; Michelle Karac; Shannon Miller; Kimberly Arnold; Rachelle Wood | Unknown | Brazil; Renata Borges; Ana Carolina; Cristina Maranhão; Tatiana Miranda |
| All-around | Michelle Karac (USA) | Shannon Miller (USA) | Unknown |
| Vault | Unknown | Unknown | Renata Borges (BRA) |
Men
| Team | United States; JD Reive; Steve McCain; Brandy Wood | Canada; Kris Burley; Paul Koopman; Richard Ikeda; Alain Brassard | Puerto Rico; Diego Lizardi; Alex Suárez; Carlos Latorre; Juan Carlos Colón |
| All-around | JD Reive (USA) | Kris Burley (CAN) | Steve McCain (USA) |
| High bar | Unknown | Unknown | Carlos Latorre (PUR) |

== Medal table ==
| Rank | Nation | Gold | Silver | Bronze | Total |
|---|---|---|---|---|---|
| 1 | United States | 11 | 3 | 3 | 17 |
| 2 | Puerto Rico | 1 | 3 | 2 | 6 |
| 3 | Canada | 1 | 3 | 1 | 5 |
| 4 | Brazil | 1 | 0 | 6 | 7 |
| Totals (4 entries) | | 14 | 9 | 12 | 35 |
