= Samantha Sepulveda =

American police officer

- Born: 1984 (age 41–42); Santo Domingo, Dominican Republic
- Other name: Sammysep
- Occupation: Police officer
- Known for: Moonlighting as a lingerie and bikini model

Samantha Sepulveda is a Long Island police officer who gained fame with a Netflix series (Million Dollar Secret) and when the New York Post reported that she is also an Internet glamour model.

== Early life ==
Sepulveda was born in the Dominican Republic. At age five, she moved to the United States with her mother and older sister. In 2003, during her senior year of high school, she earned a sports scholarship to attend the University of Massachusetts and New York state's Schloss Award for girls' lacrosse.

Sepulveda earned a bachelor's degree in management from the Isenberg School of Management while playing on the school's lacrosse team. She was the seventh-highest goal scorer in the team's history.

Sepulveda told the New York Post that, after earning her MBA, she decided to work in law enforcement, not finance, because she thought she would be better able to help people in law enforcement.

== Career ==
In mid-2013, a friend invited Sepulveda to model in a runway fashion show for their lingerie company. Sepulveda accepted, and began modeling lingerie and swimwear in her time off.

In 2013, Sepulveda appeared in a video intended to introduce, and secure funding, for a reality TV show called America's Next Great Trainer. In 2014, Muscle and Fitness magazine chose Sepulveda as one of the women in a photo profile entitled "America's hot girls of the gym". The magazine Inside Fitness profiled her in October 2015. By February 2017, Sepulveda had 110,000 followers on Instagram.

On January 22, 2017, the New York Post published an article identifying her as being a full-time model. Sepulveda later said that she had been working as a model for three years, and that her police colleagues were aware of, and supportive of her modeling. Amid the media generated by the article, Sepulveda has had multiple interviews, but has refused to name her police department to avoid any negative association that might be made between her two careers. The publicity led her Instagram followers to double, an interview on the Fox News New York affiliate, and a pictorial feature in Maxim.

== Volunteering ==
In 2019 Sepulveda played a role in a "Dream Prom Boutique", which provided free beautiful outfits for students at the high school from which she graduated. The Long Island Herald's reporting showed Sepulveda helping students pick out outfits. Sepulveda also volunteers for a local program that helps provide meals for lonely senior citizens.

Sepulveda has volunteered her financial management skills to a sustainable energy project in Thailand.

Sepulveda gives talks to high school students, encouraging them to go on to college or university.
