= J. Michael Millis =

American surgeon

James Michael Millis
- Occupations: Surgeon, academic
- Awards: Hippocrates Award; Global Citizen Hero Award from Red Cross

Academic background
- Education: B.A. in Chemistry and Political Science; M.D.
- Alma mater: University of Tennessee, College of Medicine; Emory University

James Michael Millis is an American surgeon specializing in pediatric and adult liver transplantation. He is Professor of Surgery and Vice Chair of Global Surgery at University of Chicago. He is also the director of Clinical Leadership Development Fellowship and Hepatobiliary Surgery at the University of Chicago Medical Center. He is known for developing new techniques of liver surgery that improved outcomes following liver transplantation and non transplant liver and biliary tract surgery.

== Education ==
Millis graduated with a B.A. in Chemistry and Political Science from Emory University in 1981. Later, he completed his M.D. from University of Tennessee in 1985 and joined the University of California at Los Angeles as a surgery intern. In 1987, he also started research in liver transplantation at UCLA, becoming the Dumont Transplant Fellow at the institute in 1992. At the same time, he was an instructor in surgery at UCLA. In 2014, he received an MBA from University of Massachusetts, Amherst.

== Career ==
Millis left UCLA in 1994 to join the University of Chicago as assistant professor in Department of Surgery, becoming associate professor in 1997 and professor in 2002.

In 1994, he also joined the University of Chicago Hospitals. In 1997, he was appointed the director of Pediatric Liver Transplant Program and Liver Transplant Program at University of Chicago Hospitals. He stepped down from the position of director at the Liver Transplant Program in 2006, being appointed again as the director of the program in 2014. From 2000 to 2016, he was the Chief of Section of Transplant Surgery at University of Chicago. In 2008, he founded the Transplant Center at University of Chicago Medical Center and led the center until 2016, stepping down to focus on his international efforts of improving surgical care and ethics, establishing the Global Surgery Program at the University of Chicago.

Millis has done significant work in the area of global surgery, hosting dozens of physicians and scientists from China and other countries around the world desiring experience in the United States. He developed the Clinical Leadership Development Fellowship program at University of Chicago that provides people from other countries the training to lead clinical health care enterprises. He has hosted dozens of Chinese students, residents and faculty at the University of Chicago to provide them with first-hand knowledge of the delivery of surgical care at leading academic health centers. He has also facilitated visits by US residents, fellows and faculty to Chinese centers to broaden their exposure and experience. In 2015, he was appointed the Vice Chair of Global Surgery at the University of Chicago.

In 2015, he became a senior faculty scholar at Bucksbaum Institute for Clinical Excellence and in 2017 a faculty member at the MacLean Center for Clinical Medical Ethics.

Millis serves on the editorial board of many scientific journals in the field of transplantation and surgery including World Journal of Gastroenterology and Journal of Gastrointestinal Surgery. He is also the co-editor of Hepatobiliary Surgery and Nutrition.

=== Research ===
Millis has also conducted researching exploring how cellular technology can be applied to patient care. He has organized many national and international conferences on the topics ranging from violence in healthcare to surgical research.

=== Healthy policy and ethics ===
A significant part of Millis's research has focused on policy and ethics in the field of health; and implementing ethical standards as the field of surgery becomes global. In 2006, he, with support of the China Medical Board, worked with Jiefu Huang, then the vice minister of health of China, to establish regulations governing the practice of transplantation in China and improve the outcomes and ethical standards of the transplantationin China. They initiated reforms that paved the way for banning transplant tourism and buying and selling of organs. They further established the requirements for transplant procedures including surgeon experience and ICU requirements.

Millis and Huang initiated a pilot program in China that allowed for voluntary organ donation. Upon the success of the program, it was expanded nationally. Later, in January 2018, the use of organs from executed donors was also banned in China. Their work changed the entire policy of transplantation in China. Millis also organized several conferences in China on the issues of ethics in healthcare in international settings.

In 2016, he helped the Peking Union Medical College Hospital in reforming their GME into a competency and milestone-based curriculum from their apprentice based system.

== Recognition ==
Millis received the Hippocrates Award in 2012, and the Global Citizen Hero Award from Red Cross.

== Selected publications ==
=== Books ===
- Difficult Decisions in Hepatobiliary and Pancreatic Surgery: An Evidence-Based Approach (2016)

=== Book chapters ===
- "Liver Transplantation at UCLA: A Report of Clinical Activities". In: Clinical Transplants (1988)
- "Thoracic and Abdominal Aneurysms". In: Surgical Management of Vascular Disease (1992)
- "Management of Biliary Atresia". In: Surgical Disease of the Biliary Tract and Pancreas (1994)
- "Management of Primary Hepatic Malignancies". In: Current Surgical Therapy (1995)
- "Liver Transplantation at The University of Chicago". In: Clinical Transplants (1995)
- "Transplantation for Biliary Atresia". In: Transplantation of the Liver (1996)
- "Liver Transplantation". In: Maingot's Abdominal Operations (1997)
- "The Donor and the Donor Organ". In: Primer on Transplantation (1998)
- "Liver transplantation at the University of Chicago". In: Clinical Transplants (1999)
- "The Pediatric Recipient". In: Living Donor Organ Transplantation (2007)
- "Pancreas and Islet Allotransplantation". In: Shackelford’s Seventh Edition Surgery of the Alimentary Tract (2012)
- "Endovascular Management of Solid Organ Transplant Complications". In: Endovascular Interventions (2014)
- "Transplant Ethics and Policy" in Scientific American Surgery (2016)

=== Articles ===
- DC Cronin, JM Millis, M Siegler: Transplantation of liver grafts from living donors into adults—too much, too soon. New England Journal of Medicine 344 (21), 1633–1637. (2001)
- JM Millis, DC Cronin, R Johnson, H Conjeevaram, C Conlin, S Trevino: Initial experience with the modified extracorporeal liver-assist device for patients with fulminant hepatic failure: system modifications and clinical impact. Transplantation 74 (12), 1735–1746. (2002)
- JF Buell, B Funaki, DC Cronin, A Yoshida, MK Perlman, J Lorenz, S Kelly: Long-term venous complications after full-size and segmental pediatric liver transplantation. Annals of surgery 236 (5), 658. (2002)
- JF Buell, DC Cronin, B Funaki, A Koffron, A Yoshida, A Lo, J Leef: Devastating and fatal complications associated with combined vascular and bile duct injuries during cholecystectomy. Archives of Surgery 137 (6), 703–710. (2002)
- IR Diamond, A Fecteau, JM Millis, JE Losanoff, V Ng, R Anand, C Song: Impact of graft type on outcome in pediatric liver transplantation: a report from Studies of Pediatric Liver Transplantation (SPLIT). Annals of surgery 246 (2), 301. (2007)
- J Huang, Y Mao, JM Millis: Government policy and organ transplantation in China. The Lancet 372 (9654), 1937-1938 (2008)
- Y Mao, H Yang, H Xu, X Lu, X Sang, S Du, H Zhao, W Chen, Y Xu, T Chi: Golgi protein 73 (GOLPH2) is a valuable serum marker for hepatocellular carcinoma. Gut 59 (12), 1687–169. (2010)
- PG Stock, B Barin, B Murphy, D Hanto, JM Diego, J Light, C Davis: Outcomes of kidney transplantation in HIV-infected recipients. New England Journal of Medicine 363 (21), 2004–2014. (2010)
- NA Terrault, ME Roland, T Schiano, L Dove, MT Wong, F Poordad: Outcomes of liver transplant recipients with hepatitis C and human immunodeficiency virus coinfection. Liver Transplantation 18 (6), 716–726. (2012)
- J Huang, JM Millis, Y Mao, MA Millis, X Sang, S Zhong: A pilot programme of organ donation after cardiac death in China. The Lancet 379 (9818), 862–865. (2012)
