= 3199 Nefertiti =

Near-Earth asteroid

Discovery
- Discovered by: C. Shoemaker; E. Shoemaker
- Discovery site: Palomar Obs.
- Discovery date: 13 September 1982

Designations
- Pronunciation: /nɛfərˈtiːti/ nef-ər-TEE-tee
- Named after: Nefertiti (Egyptian queen)
- Alternative designations: 1982 RA
- Minor planet category: Amor · NEO

Orbital characteristics
- Epoch 4 September 2017 (JD 2458000.5)
- Uncertainty parameter 0
- Observation arc: 34.71 yr (12,678 days)
- Aphelion: 2.0219 AU
- Perihelion: 1.1272 AU
- Semi-major axis: 1.5745 AU
- Eccentricity: 0.2841
- Orbital period (sidereal): 1.98 yr (722 days)
- Mean anomaly: 221.90°
- Mean motion: 0° 29^{m} 56.04^{s} / day
- Inclination: 32.962°
- Longitude of ascending node: 340.01°
- Argument of perihelion: 53.411°
- Earth MOID: 0.2157 AU · 84 LD

Physical characteristics
- Dimensions: 2.18 km (derived); 2.2 km (Gehrels)
- Synodic rotation period: 2.82 h 3.01 h 3.020167 h 3.021 h 3.021±0.002 h
- Geometric albedo: 0.326 (derived); 0.42 (Gehrels)
- Spectral type: B–V = 0.895; U–B = 0.418; S (Tholen), · Sq (SMASS) · K · Q · S
- Absolute magnitude (H): 14.00 · 14.84 · 15.02 · 15.12±0.50 · 15.13 · 15.14

3199 Nefertiti (/nɛfərˈtiːti/ nef-ər-TEE-tee), provisional designation 1982 RA, is a rare-type asteroid of the Amor group approximately 2.2 kilometers in diameter. It was discovered on 13 September 1982, by American astronomer couple Carolyn and Eugene Shoemaker at Palomar Observatory, California, United States.

== Orbit and classification ==
Nefertiti orbits the Sun at a distance of 1.1–2.0 AU once every 1 years and 12 months (722 days). Its orbit has an eccentricity of 0.28 and an inclination of 33° with respect to the ecliptic.

It has an Earth minimum orbital intersection distance of 0.2157 AU (32,300,000 km), or 84 lunar distances. As no precoveries were taken, and no prior identifications were made, the body's observation arc begins with its official discovery observation at Palomar in 1982.

== Physical characteristics ==
=== Spectral type ===
In the Tholen and SMASS taxonomy, Nefertiti is a stony S-type and transitional Sq-type, respectively. In addition, its spectral type is also that of a bright and rare K and Q type, according to Spitzer and PanSTARRS. The Collaborative Asteroid Lightcurve Link derives an albedo of 0.326 and a diameter of 2.18 kilometers with an absolute magnitude of 15.14.

=== Rotation period ===
Several rotational lightcurves of Nefertiti have been obtained from photometric observations. In descending order of quality, rotation periods were derived by Czech astronomer Petr Pravec in the 1990s (3.021 hours; Δ0.30 mag; U=3), at the Italian Padova and Catania observatories in February 2003 (3.021 hours; Δ0.19 mag; U=3-), by Polish astronomer Wiesław Z. Wiśniewski in the 1980s (2.82 hours; Δ0.12 mag; U=2), by Finnish physicist Mikko Kaasalainen (3.020167 hours; Δmag n.a.; U=n.a.), and by Harris at JPL/Caltech in the 1980s (3.01 hours; Δ0.1 mag; U=n.a.).

== Naming ==
This minor planet was named for the ancient Egyptian queen Nefertiti (ca. 1370–1330 BC), mother-in-law of pharaoh Tutankhamun and Chief King's Wife of Akhenaten of the 18th dynasty. Nefertiti and her "heretic" husband are believed to be responsible for a religious revolution, creating a new monotheistic religion, in which they only worshiped the sun disc god Aten. Another minor planet, 1068 Nofretete is also named for her, using a different spelling. The official naming citation was published by the Minor Planet Center on 27 December 1985 (M.P.C. 10311).
