= Nefertiti A. Walker =

- Born: Atlanta, Georgia, USA

Academic background
- Education: Georgia Tech; BA, 2005, MBA, 2006, Stetson University; PhD, Sport Management, 2011, University of Florida
- Thesis: A multilevel perspective on the underrepresentation of women in the male dominated sport workplace: the case of men's college basketball (2011)

Academic work
- Institutions: Isenberg School of Management
- Website: nefertitiwalker.com/about-nef/

Nefertiti A. Walker is the Interim Vice Chancellor for Diversity, Equity, and Inclusion at the Isenberg School of Management. She formally played Division 1 NCAA women's basketball at Georgia Tech before transferring to Stetson University.

== Early life ==
Growing up in Atlanta, Georgia, Walker was encouraged by her father to play basketball, which she began at the age of three. She attended Woodward Academy in College Park, Georgia before signing a letter of intent with Georgia Tech in 2001. While at Woodward, Walker was named an honorable mention All-America and earned first-team Class AAA All-State honors in her junior year. Between North Clayton High School and Woodward, she scored more than 1,500 points for the girls basketball team.

=== Collegiate basketball ===
Walker began her collegiate career at Georgia Tech from 2001 until 2003. Following her sophomore year, she transferred to Stetson University and was forced to sit out for one season as a result. Upon joining the Stetson Hatters women's basketball in 2004, she was named team co-captain with Kristy Brown. The following season, Walker was selected for the Second Team All-Conference as the result of her improved play. She was among the league leaders in free throw percentages, three-point percentage, and three-pointers made. She also set the school record for single season free throw percentage. In her senior year, Walker helped the Hatters win a conference championship and led them to the program's first NCAA Women's Basketball National Tournament appearance. Along the way, she set the school's single season three-point percentage record and single-season points record with 581. As a result, Walker was named to the 2006 First-Team All-Conference and later appointed assistant coach after graduation. Coach Dee Romine spoke highly of Walker as a player, saying "She's an outstanding shooter...I don't think people give her credit in terms of her defensive ability as well."

Walker was selected as a Women's National Basketball Association (WNBA) Top-40 pre-draft selection in 2006 and was signed to play professionally in Bohn, Germany, but chose to forgo a career in basketball and pursue a PhD. Upon earning her Bachelor of Arts and master's of business administration from Stetson, she enrolled at the University of Florida for her PhD in Sport Management.

=== Georgia Tech and Stetson statistics ===
Legend
GP	Games played	GS	Games started	MPG	Minutes per game
FG%	Field goal percentage	3P%	3-point field goal percentage	FT%	Free throw percentage
RPG	Rebounds per game	APG	Assists per game	SPG	Steals per game
BPG	Blocks per game	PPG	Points per game	**Bold**	Career high

Year	Team	GP	Points	FG%	3P%	FT%	RPG	APG	SPG	BPG	PPG
2001-02	Georgia Tech	25	95	34.1%	27.5%	78.8%	1.2	0.9	0.4	0.2	3.8
2002-03	Georgia Tech	12	16	22.2%	15.4%	**100.0%**	0.6	0.2	0.3	0.1	1.3
2003-04	Stetson	Sat due to NCAA transfer rules									
2004-05	Stetson	**31**	483	**39.9%**	**41.8%**	92.0%	3.1	**2.1**	0.6	0.4	15.6
2005-06	Stetson	27	**581**	36.5%	37.2%	91.4%	**3.2**	1.6	**0.8**	**0.8**	**21.5**
Career		95	1175	37.3%	37.4%	90.0%	2.3	1.4	0.6	0.4	12.4

== Career ==
In 2011, Walker accepted a faculty position in the Mark H. McCormack Department of Sport Management at the Isenberg School of Management and was inducted into Stetson's Sport's Hall of Fame. In her first few years at the school, she co-published Hegemonic Masculinity and the Institutionalized Bias Toward Women in Men’s Collegiate Basketball: What Do Men Think? with Melanie L. Sartore-Baldwin in the Journal of Sport Management.

During the 2016–17 academic year, Walker worked with the espnW College Advisory Panel to facilitate conversations about female student-athletes on campus. She also served as a member of the LGBT Sports Foundation, vice president for inclusion and social justice for the National Association for Girls and Women in Sports, and was the former faculty advisor for the Isenberg and McCormack student group Association of Diversity in Sport. As a result, Walker was appointed the Director of Diversity and Inclusion at the Isenberg School of Management in January 2017. Two years later, Walker received the Research Fellow Award from the North American Society for Sport Management and was named the Interim Associate Chancellor for Diversity, Equity, and Inclusion at UMass Amherst.
