= Administration & Society =

- Discipline: Public administration
- Language: English
- Edited by: Brian J. Cook

Publication details
- History: 1969–present
- Publisher: SAGE Publications
- Frequency: 10/year
- Impact factor: 2.3 (2022)

Standard abbreviations
- ISO 4: Adm. Soc.

Indexing
- ISSN: 0095-3997 (print); 1552-3039 (web)
- LCCN: 74647790
- OCLC no.: 1796118

Links
- Journal homepage; Online access; Online archive

Administration and Society is a peer-reviewed academic journal that covers the field of public administration. The journal's editor-in-chief is Brian J. Cook (Virginia Tech). It was established in 1969 and is currently published by SAGE Publications.

== Abstracting and indexing ==
Administration and Society is abstracted and indexed in Scopus and the Social Sciences Citation Index. According to the Journal Citation Reports, its 2022 impact factor (IF) is 2.3, ranking it 32 out of 49 journals in the category "Public Administration".
