= Bernie Mullin =

British sports executive (born 1949)

- Born: 3 May 1949 (age 76); Liverpool, England
- Education: Coventry University (B.A.); University of Kansas (M.S., M.B.A., Ph.D.)
- Occupation: Sports executive
- Years active: 1986–present

Bernard James Mullin (born 3 May 1949) is a published author and the former chief executive officer of Atlanta Spirit. He is currently a director of The Aspire Group.

== Early life and education ==
Mullin was born 3 May 1949 in Liverpool, England. He attended Coventry University and graduated with a B.A. in business studies.

== Personal life ==
Mullin is a known Everton fan. In March 2011 it was reported that he was attempting to form a consortium to buy the club.

== Bibliography ==
- Sport Marketing ISBN 0-7360-6052-9
