= 1068 Nofretete =

Main-belt asteroid

Discovery
- Discovered by: E. Delporte
- Discovery site: Uccle Obs.
- Discovery date: 13 September 1926

Designations
- Pronunciation: /nɒfrəˈtiːtə/ (Note: Pronunciation of "Nofretete" from Collins English Dictionary. The original naming in German is pronounced as nɔfʁəˈteːtə.)
- Named after: Nefertiti (Ancient Egyptian Queen)
- Alternative designations: 1926 RK · 1929 CV
- Minor planet category: main-belt · (outer) background

Orbital characteristics
- Epoch 4 September 2017 (JD 2458000.5)
- Uncertainty parameter 0
- Observation arc: 88.73 yr (32,409 days)
- Aphelion: 3.1868 AU
- Perihelion: 2.6274 AU
- Semi-major axis: 2.9071 AU
- Eccentricity: 0.0962
- Orbital period (sidereal): 4.96 yr (1,810 days)
- Mean anomaly: 250.26°
- Mean motion: 0° 11^{m} 55.68^{s} / day
- Inclination: 5.4840°
- Longitude of ascending node: 318.69°
- Argument of perihelion: 267.47°

Physical characteristics
- Dimensions: 21.346±0.106 km 22.03 km (derived); 23.186±0.116 km 23.92±0.74 km 26.73±0.45 km
- Synodic rotation period: 6.15 h
- Geometric albedo: 0.104±0.007; 0.142±0.025; 0.1832±0.0400; 0.20 (assumed)
- Spectral type: S B–V = 0.850; U–B = 0.420
- Absolute magnitude (H): 10.60 · 10.65 · 10.7 · 10.84±0.47 · 11.20

1068 Nofretete (/nɒfrəˈtiːtə/), provisional designation 1926 RK, is a stony asteroid from the background population in the outer asteroid belt, approximately 23 kilometers in diameter. It was discovered on 13 September 1926, by Belgian astronomer Eugène Delporte at the Royal Observatory of Belgium in Uccle. The asteroid was named after the Ancient Egyptian Queen Nefertiti by its German name "Nofretete". The near-Earth asteroid 3199 Nefertiti is also named after her.

== Orbit and classification ==
Nofretete is a non-family asteroid from the main belt's background population. It orbits the Sun in the outer asteroid belt at a distance of 2.6–3.2 AU once every 4 years and 12 months (1,810 days; semi-major axis of 2.91 AU). Its orbit has an eccentricity of 0.10 and an inclination of 5° with respect to the ecliptic. The body's observation arc begins at Uccle in September 1926, three nights after its official discovery observation.

== Physical characteristics ==
Nofretete has been characterized as a stony S-type asteroid by American astronomer Richard Binzel.

=== Rotation period ===
In May 1984, a rotational lightcurve of Nofretete was obtained from photometric observations by Richard Binzel which gave a rotation period of 6.15 hours with a low brightness amplitude of 0.04 magnitude, indicative for a nearly spheroidal shape (U=2).

=== Diameter and albedo ===
According to the surveys carried out by the Japanese Akari satellite and the NEOWISE mission of NASA's Wide-field Infrared Survey Explorer, Nofretete measures between 21.346 and 26.73 kilometers in diameter and its surface has an albedo between 0.104 and 0.1832.

The Collaborative Asteroid Lightcurve Link assumes a standard albedo for stony asteroids of 0.20 and derives a diameter of 22.03 kilometers based on an absolute magnitude of 10.65.

== Naming ==
This minor planet was named by German astronomer Gustav Stracke after the Ancient Egyptian Queen Nefertiti (c.1370 – c.1330 BC) by its common German name "Nofretete". She was the wife of pharaoh Akhenaten (a.k.a. Echnaton or Amenhotep IV), after whom the asteroid 4847 Amenhotep is named. The official naming citation was mentioned in The Names of the Minor Planets by Paul Herget in 1955 (H 101). The near-Earth asteroid 3199 Nefertiti, discovered by American astronomers Carolyn and Eugene Shoemaker at Palomar, was also named after her.
