= Queen Nefertiti Rock =

Pillar in Grand County, Utah

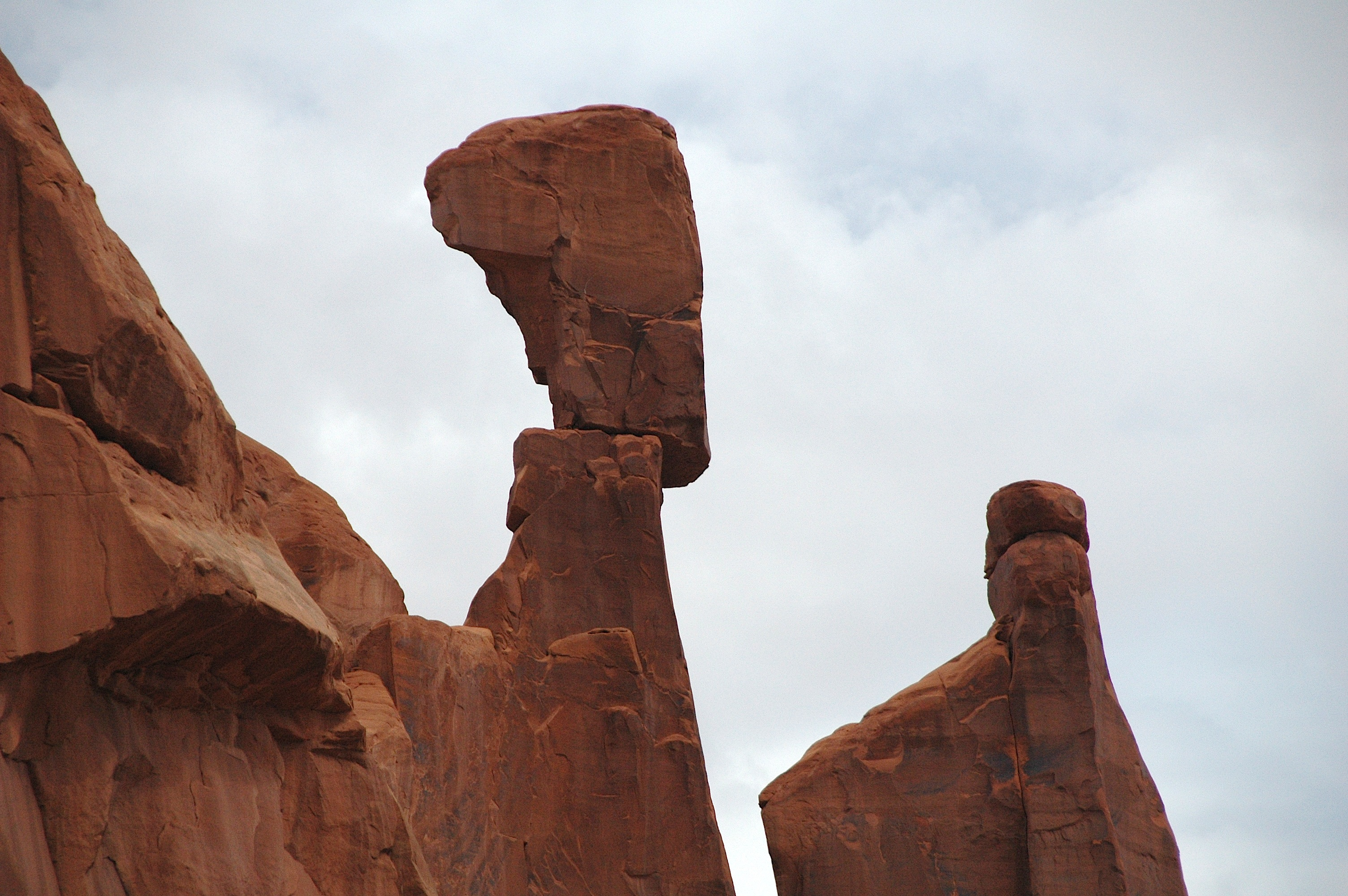
- Southeast aspect

Highest point
- Elevation: 4,741 ft (1,445 m)
- Prominence: 40 ft (12 m)
- Parent peak: Three Penguins
- Isolation: 0.32 mi (0.51 km)
- Coordinates: 38°37′40″N 109°36′10″W

Naming
- Etymology: Queen Nefertiti

Geography
- Location within Utah Location within the United States
- Country: United States
- State: Utah
- County: Grand
- Protected area: Arches National Park
- Parent range: Colorado Plateau
- Topo map: USGS The Windows Section

Geology
- Rock age: Jurassic
- Rock type: Entrada Sandstone

Climbing
- Easiest route: class 5.9 climbing

Queen Nefertiti Rock is a 4,741-foot-elevation (1,445-meter) pillar in Grand County, Utah. The feature is located within Arches National Park and like many of the rock formations in the park, Queen Nefertiti Rock is composed of Entrada Sandstone. Topographic relief is significant as the summit rises 400 feet (122 meters) above the Park Avenue Trail in 0.1 mile (0.16 km). Precipitation runoff from Queen Nefertiti Rock drains to the nearby Colorado River via Courthouse Wash. This landform's descriptive toponym has been officially adopted by the United States Board on Geographic Names, and is so named because the feature resembles the head of Queen Nefertiti.

== Climate ==
According to the Köppen climate classification system, Queen Nefertiti Rock is located in a cold semi-arid climate zone with cold winters and hot summers. Spring and fall are the most favorable seasons to experience Arches National Park, when highs average 60 to 80 °F (15 to 25 °C) and lows average 30 to 50 °F (0 to 10 °C). Summer temperatures often exceed 100 °F (40 °C). Winters are cold, with highs averaging 30 to 50 °F (0 to 10 °C), and lows averaging 0 to 20 °F (−20 to −5 °C). As part of a high desert region, it can experience wide daily temperature fluctuations. The park receives an average of less than 10 inches (25 cm) of rain annually.

== Gallery ==
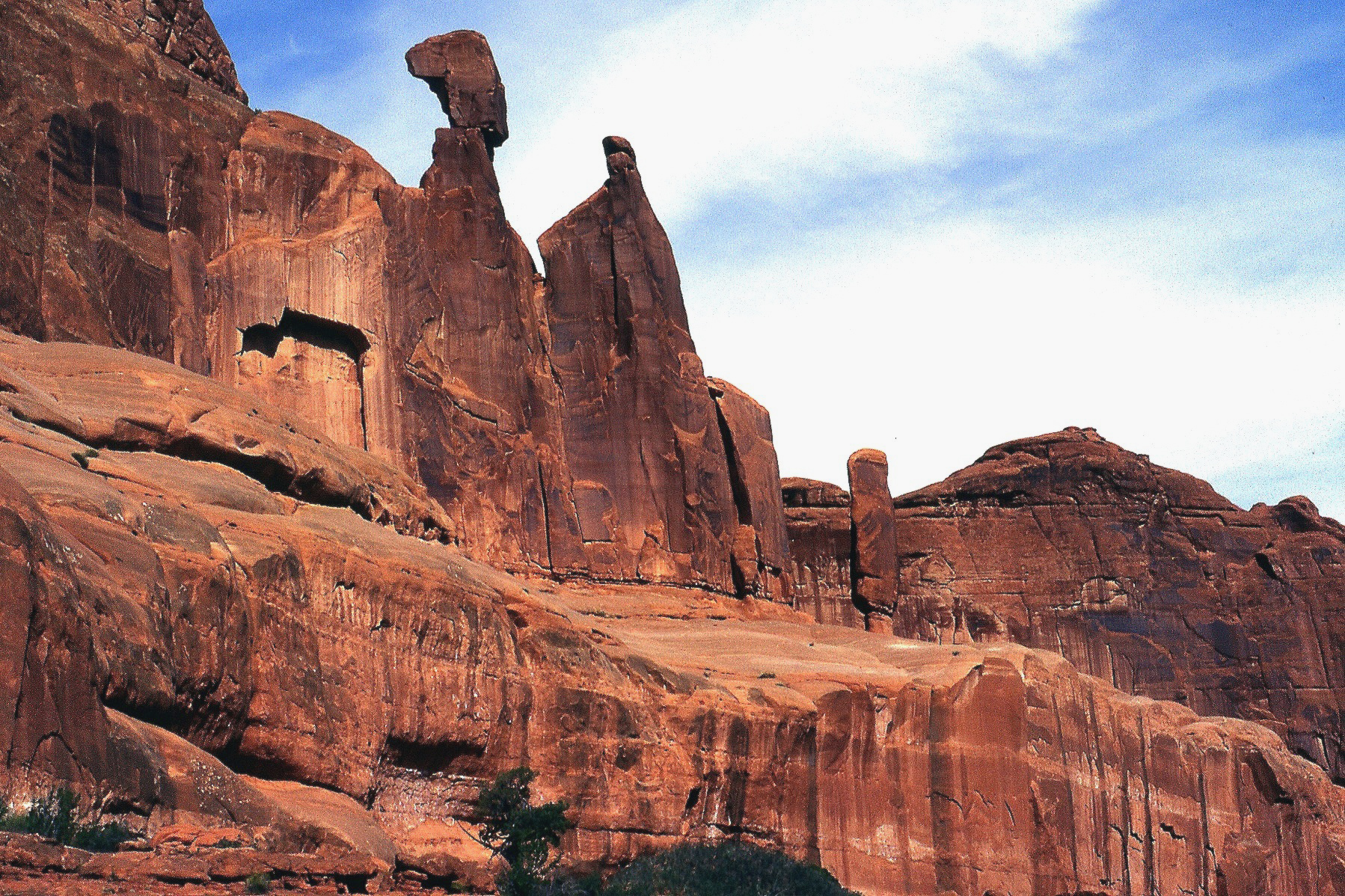

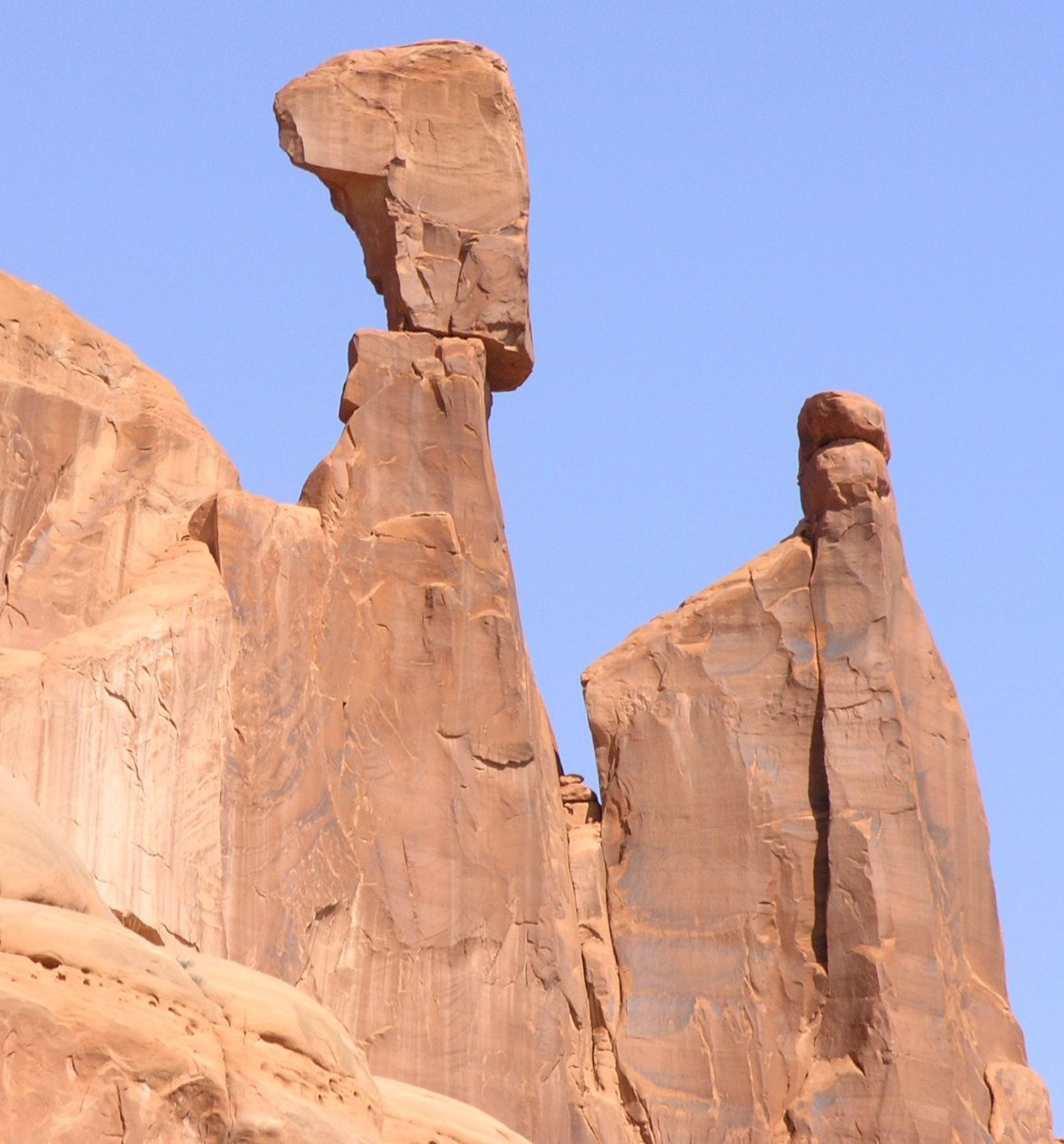

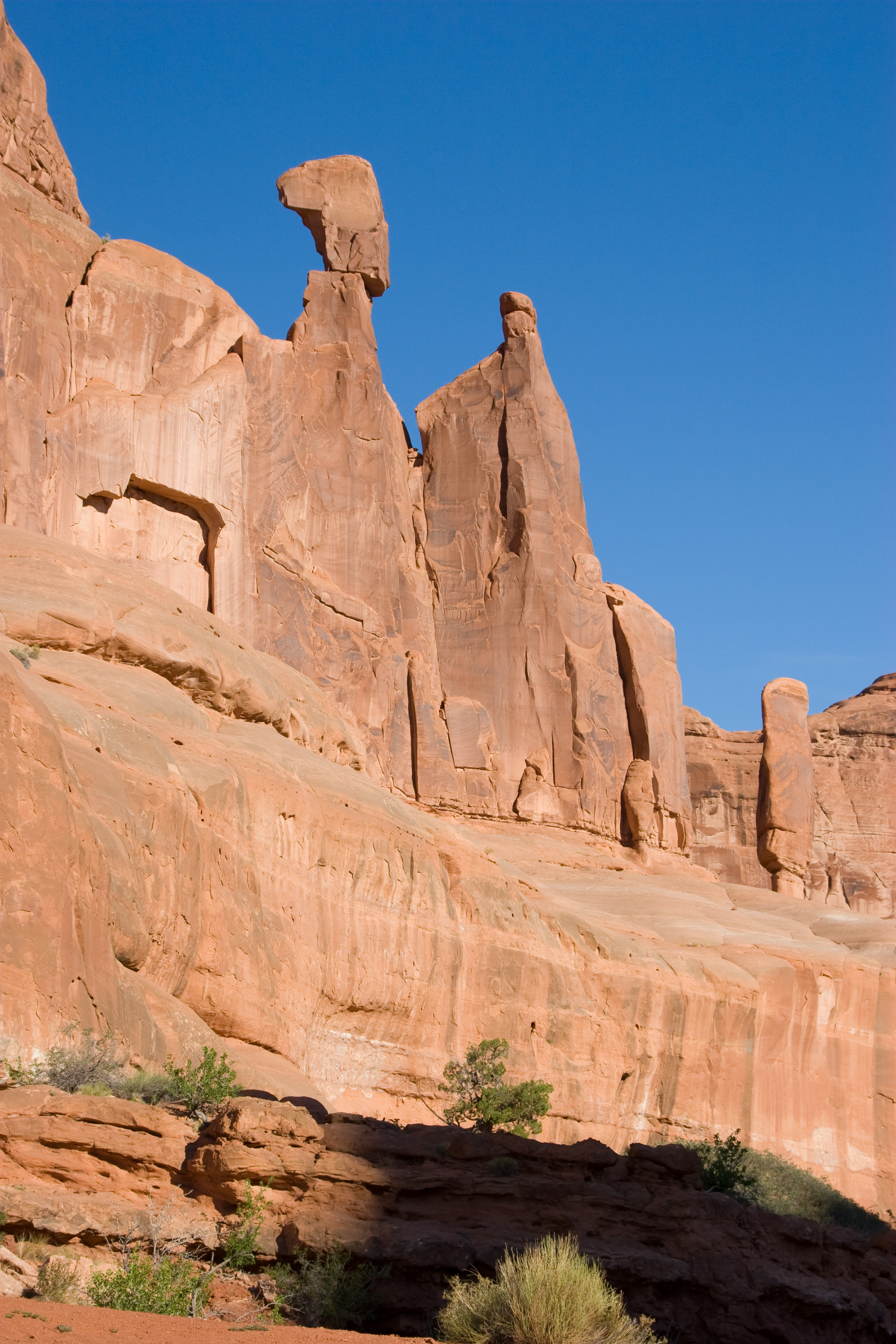

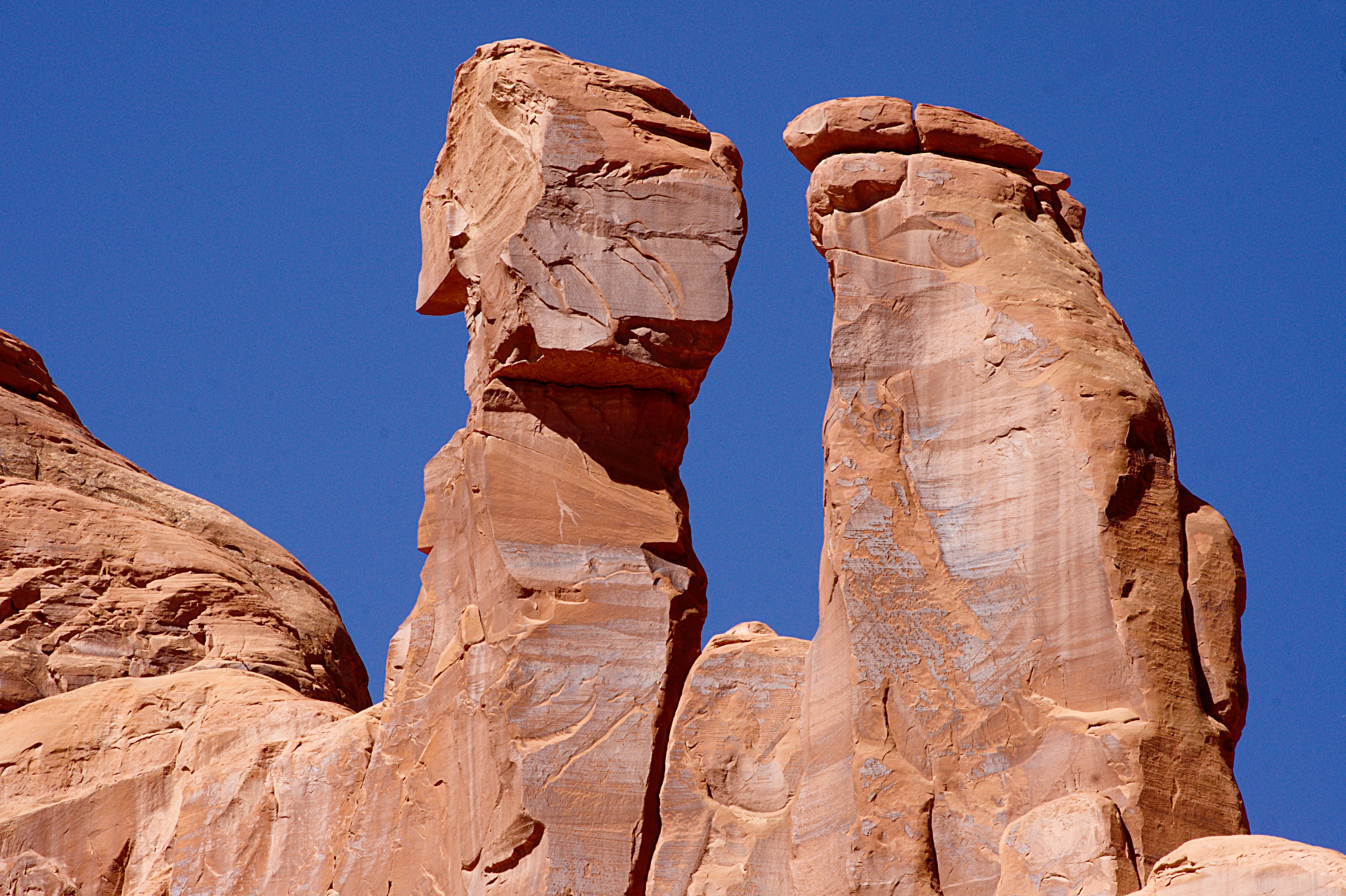
Queen Nefertiti Rock from a less recognizable aspect (East-northeast)

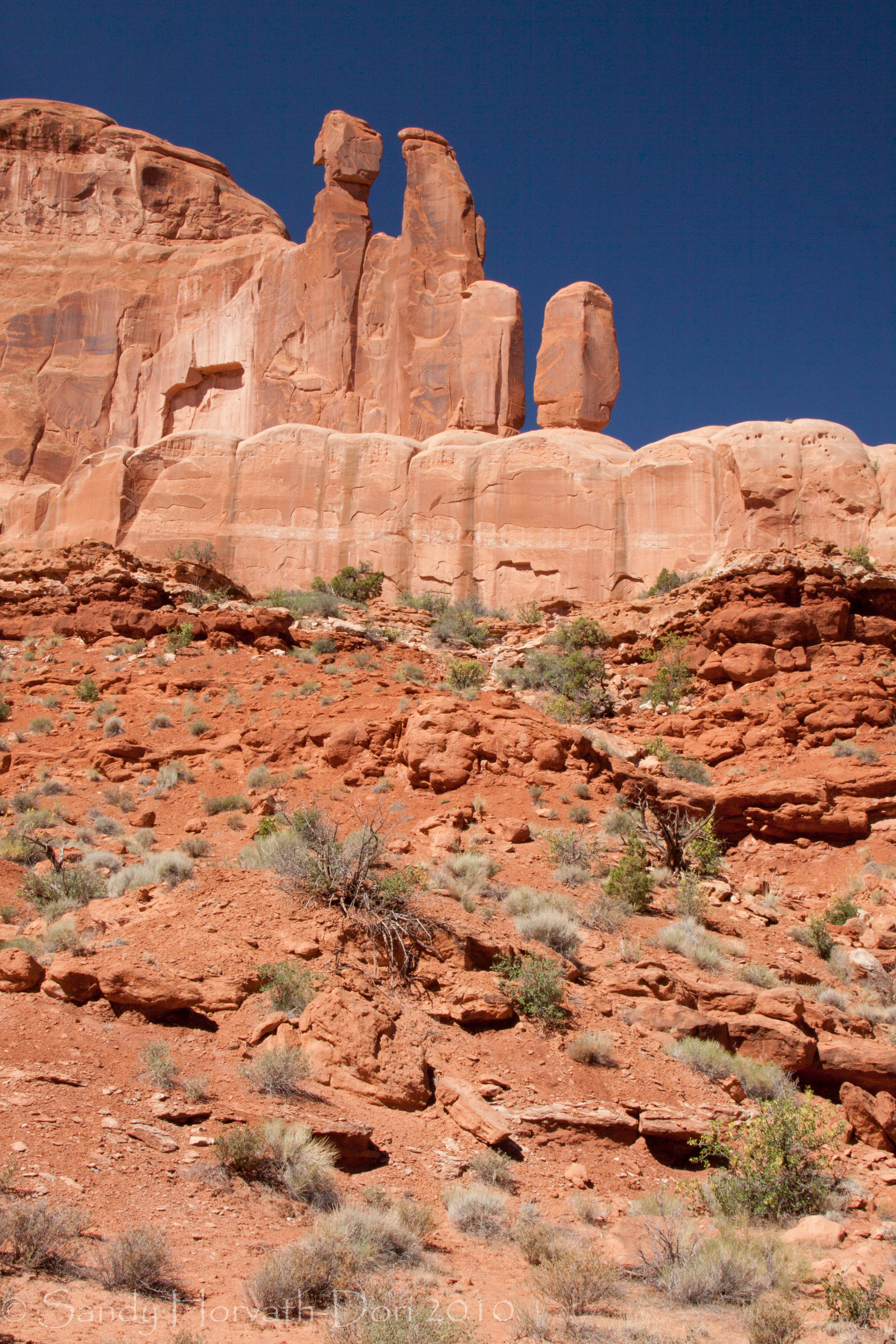
Queen Nefertiti Rock and The Sausage

== See also ==
- Geology of Utah
