= National Register of Historic Places listings in Grand County, Utah =

Location of Grand County in Utah

This is a list of the National Register of Historic Places listings in Grand County, Utah.

This is intended to be a complete list of the properties and districts on the National Register of Historic Places in Grand County, Utah, United States. Latitude and longitude coordinates are provided for many National Register properties and districts; these locations may be seen together in a map.

There are 23 properties and districts listed on the National Register in the county, including 1 National Historic Landmark.

This National Park Service list is complete through NPS recent listings posted September 26, 2025.

== Current listings ==
Including those in Arches National Park, the current listings are:

	Name on the Register	Image	Date listed	Location	City or town	Description
1	Apache Motel	Apache Motel	February 19, 2008 (#08000062)	166 South 400 East; 38°34′15″N 109°32′34″W	Moab	
2	Ballard-Sego Coal Mine Historic District	Ballard-Sego Coal Mine Historic District	October 13, 2017 (#100001335)	Address Restricted	Sego	
3	Courthouse Wash Pictographs	Courthouse Wash Pictographs	April 1, 1976 (#76000207)	One mile (1.6 km) northwest of Moab in Arches National Park on U.S. Route 191 (formerly U.S. Route 163); 38°36′26″N 109°34′47″W	Arches National Park	
4	Dalton Wells CCC Camp-Moab Relocation Center	Dalton Wells CCC Camp-Moab Relocation Center	May 2, 1994 (#94000366)	U.S. Route 191, approximately 13 miles (21 km) north of Moab; 38°42′46″N 109°41′58″W	Moab	Little survives except for pylons which once held the entrance sign and cottonwood trees planted by camp workers.
5	Desolation Canyon	Desolation Canyon	November 24, 1968 (#68000057)	Along the Green River in western Grand County between Ouray and Green River; 39°30′01″N 110°01′19″W	Green River	Split between Emery, Grand, Carbon, and Uintah counties
6	Dewey Bridge	Dewey Bridge	July 12, 1984 (#84002179)	East of State Route 128 over the Colorado River; 38°48′43″N 109°18′09″W	Dewey	Destroyed by fire in April 2008
7	Elk Mountain Mission Fort Site	Elk Mountain Mission Fort Site	June 15, 1978 (#78002661)	Immediately northwest of Moab off U.S. Route 191; 38°35′19″N 109°33′45″W	Moab	
8	Johnson Ranch House		June 28, 2018 (#100002636)	Hastings Road 21 miles (34 km), northwest of Crescent Junction; 39°04′59″N 110°03′37″W	Crescent Junction vicinity	
9	Julien Inscription Panel		October 6, 1988 (#88001184)	Dark Angel vicinity, Arches National Park; 38°49′23″N 109°39′00″W	Moab	
10	Denis Julien Inscription	Denis Julien Inscription	May 23, 1991 (#91000617)	Mouth of Hell Roaring Canyon, Green River Canyon, Canyonlands National Park; 38°33′49″N 109°59′02″W	Moab	
11	Moab Cabin	Moab Cabin	February 14, 1980 (#80003906)	56 South 100 East; 38°34′22″N 109°32′46″W	Moab	
12	Moab LDS Church	Moab LDS Church	November 28, 1980 (#80003907)	65 North 200 East; 38°34′27″N 109°32′43″W	Moab	
13	Old Spanish Trail		October 6, 1988 (#88001181)	Arches National Park Visitor Center vicinity 38°36′44″N 109°37′14″W	Moab	
14	Pinhook Battleground	Pinhook Battleground	March 1, 1982 (#82004125)	East of Moab; 38°34′31″N 109°18′55″W	Moab	
15	Ringhoffer Inscription		October 6, 1988 (#88001185)	Tower Arch, Arches National Park; 38°47′25″N 109°41′17″W	Moab	
16	Robidoux Inscription		July 23, 1982 (#82004124)	West side of Westwater Creek in Book Cliffs, where East Canyon meets the main canyon 39°16′34″N 109°17′12″W	Cisco	
17	Rock House-Custodian's Residence	Rock House-Custodian's Residence	October 6, 1988 (#88001186)	Arches National Park Visitor Center vicinity 38°37′04″N 109°36′55″W	Moab	
18	John Henry Shafer House	John Henry Shafer House	May 2, 2001 (#01000472)	530 South 400 East; 38°33′54″N 109°32′36″W	Moab	
19	Star Hall	Star Hall	May 14, 1993 (#93000416)	159 East Center Street; 38°34′25″N 109°32′48″W	Moab	
20	Arthur Taylor House	Arthur Taylor House	February 28, 1980 (#80003908)	1266 North U.S. Route 191; 38°35′34″N 109°33′46″W	Moab	
21	Thompson Wash Rock Art District	Thompson Wash Rock Art District	August 1, 1980 (#80003909)	Address Restricted; 39°01′05″N 109°42′37″W	Sego	While the National Park Service indicates that the address is restricted for this historic district, the Bureau of Land Management (which refers to the area as the Sego Canyon Rock Art Interpretive Site) provides coordinates and directions
22	Orlando W. Warner House		September 20, 1977 (#77001304)	1010 South Mill Creek Drive; 38°33′45″N 109°31′57″W	Moab	Adobe house from c. 1890, and fruit warehouse. Not visible from road.
23	Wolfe Ranch Historical District	Wolfe Ranch Historical District	November 20, 1975 (#75000167)	North of Moab in Arches National Park; 38°44′15″N 109°31′19″W	Moab	

== See also ==
- National Register of Historic Places listings in Arches National Park
- List of National Historic Landmarks in Utah
- National Register of Historic Places listings in Utah
