= National Register of Historic Places listings in Arches National Park =

This is a list of the National Register of Historic Places listings in Arches National Park.

This is intended to be a complete list of the properties and districts on the National Register of Historic Places in Arches National Park, Utah, United States. The locations of National Register properties and districts for which the latitude and longitude coordinates are included below, may be seen in a Google map.

There are six properties and districts listed on the National Register in the park.

This National Park Service list is complete through NPS recent listings posted June 20, 2025.

== Current listings ==
	Name on the Register	Image	Date listed	Location	City or town	Description
1	Courthouse Wash Pictographs	Courthouse Wash Pictographs	April 1, 1976 (#76000207)	1 mile northwest of Moab in Arches National Park on State Route 163; 38°36′26″N 109°34′47″W	Moab	
2	Julien Inscription Panel		October 6, 1988 (#88001184)	Dark Angel vicinity 38°49′23″N 109°39′00″W	Moab	
3	Old Spanish Trail	Old Spanish Trail	October 6, 1988 (#88001181)	Visitor Center vicinity 38°36′44″N 109°37′14″W	Moab	
4	Ringhoffer Inscription		October 6, 1988 (#88001185)	Tower Arch; 38°47′25″N 109°41′17″W	Moab	
5	Rock House-Custodian's Residence	Rock House-Custodian's Residence	October 6, 1988 (#88001186)	Arches National Park Visitor Center vicinity 38°37′04″N 109°36′55″W	Moab	
6	Wolfe Ranch Historical District	Wolfe Ranch Historical District	November 20, 1975 (#75000167)	North of Moab in Arches National Park; 38°44′15″N 109°31′19″W	Moab	

== See also ==
- National Register of Historic Places listings in Grand County, Utah
- National Register of Historic Places listings in Utah
