= Devils Garden (Arches National Park) =

Natural formation in Arches National Park in Grand County, Utah, United States

Coordinates: 38°48′14″N 109°36′49″W

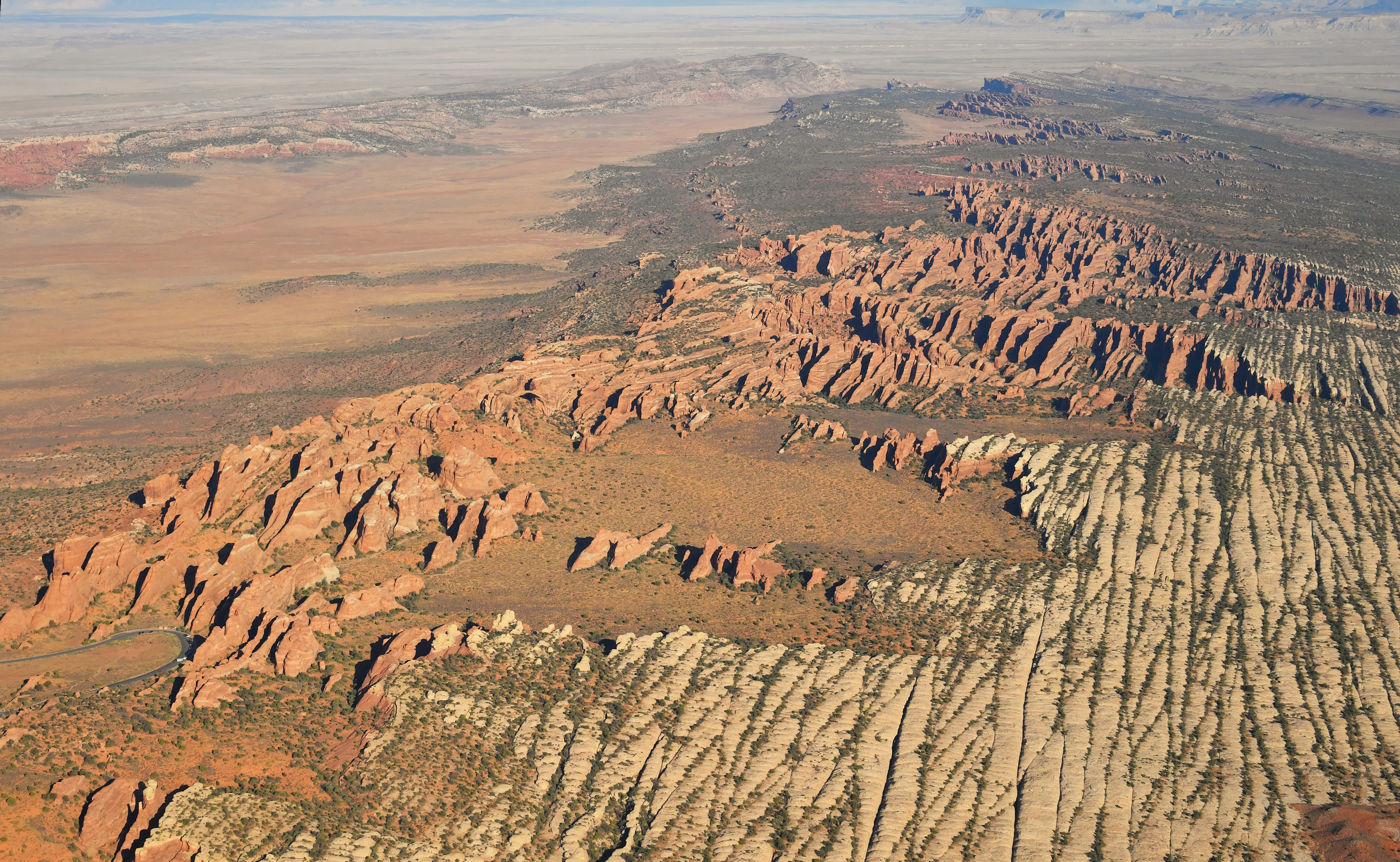
Aerial view of Devils Garden from the southeast

Landscape Arch

Devils Garden (Note: Physical features named by the USGS do not include an apostrophe, in most cases) is an area of Arches National Park, located near Moab, Utah, United States, that features a series of rock fins and arches formed by erosion. The Devils Garden Trail, including more primitive sections and spurs, meanders through the area for 7.2 mi (11.6 km). The trailhead leads directly to Landscape Arch after a 0.8 mi (1.3 km) outbound hike, while Tunnel Arch and Pine Tree Arch can be seen on spur trails on the way to Landscape Arch. Several other arches, including Partition, Navajo, Double O, and Private Arch, as well as the Dark Angel monolith and Fin Canyon, are accessed via the primitive loop trail and its spurs.

Wall Arch, before its collapse in 2008, was also located in Devils Garden just north of Landscape Arch. Black Arch is visible as a dark outline from the primitive trail and can be approached via an unmarked sidetrack.

The trailhead for Devils Garden is located at the end of the main park road. A campground and amphitheater are also available at the site.

== History ==
In the early 1920s, an immigrant prospector from Hungary named Alexander Ringhoffer came across the Klondike Bluffs, a similar area with fins and arches to the west of Salt Valley, which he named Devil's Garden. Ringhoffer contacted officials at the Denver and Rio Grande Western Railroad to determine whether the land could become a tourist attraction. The railroad company realized the lucrative potential of the area and contacted the National Park Service to consider making it a national monument. President Herbert Hoover signed an executive order on April 12, 1929 that created Arches National Monument. The monument originally consisted of two parts: the Windows and Devils Garden, with the latter name being taken from Ringhoffer's name for the Klondike Bluffs, an area not initially included in the park. Arches remained a national monument until 1971 when Congress passed a bill that re-designated it as a national park.

== Geography ==
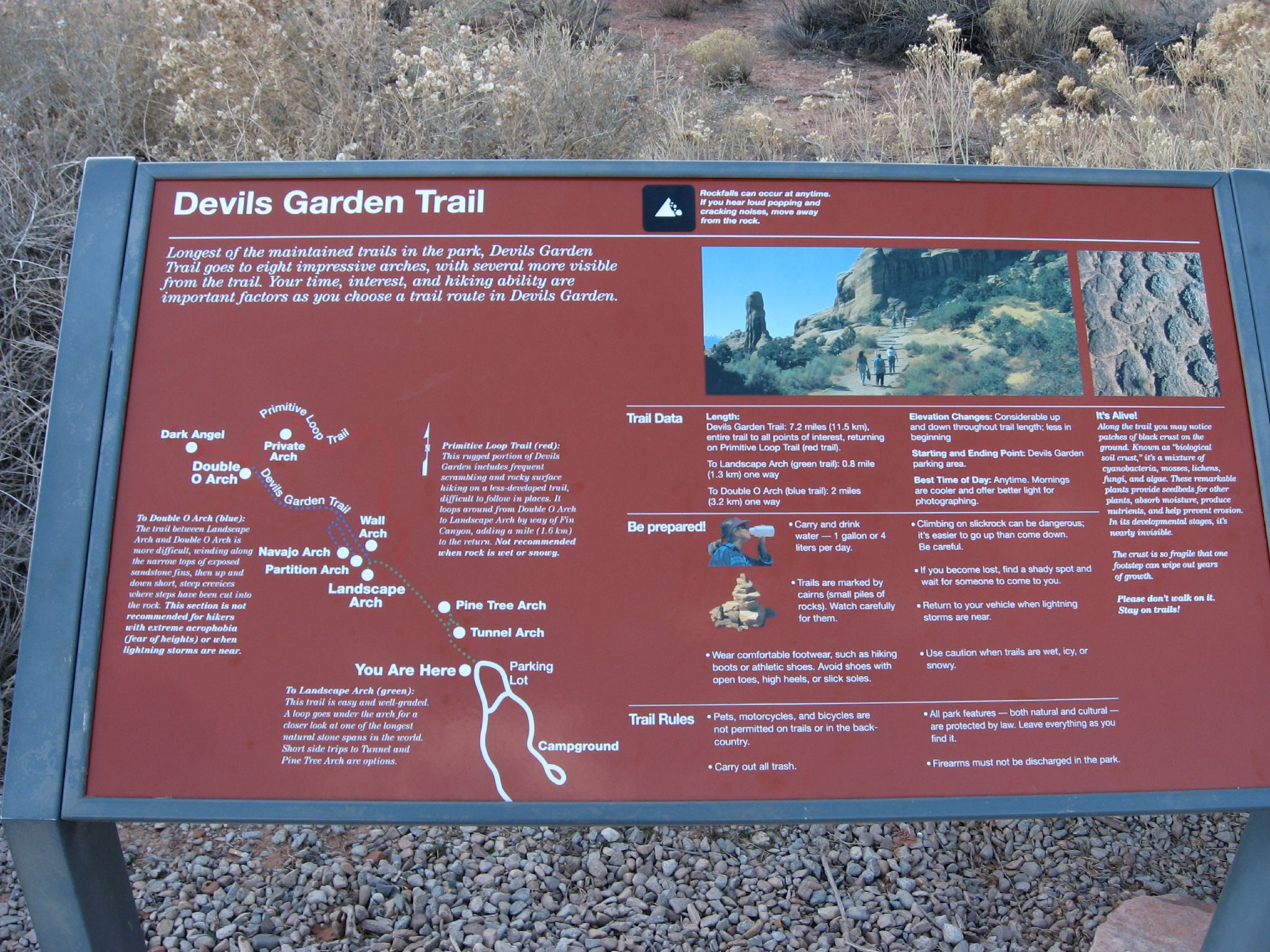
Trail sign with map

The Devils Garden trailhead and campground are located 18 mi (29 km) from the park's entrance station at the end of the main park road. The trail through the Devils Garden, including the primitive loop section and spurs, has a total length of 7.2 mi (11.6 km). The primary trail to Landscape Arch is a graded gravel path, while the primitive loop trail, which begins and ends at Landscape Arch, is more challenging with steep, sloping surfaces and close proximity to drop-offs. Landscape Arch, with the longest span of any natural arch in North America, is reached after a 0.8 mi (1.3 km) outbound hike, while Tunnel Arch and Pine Tree Arch can be seen on short spur trails located along the trail to Landscape Arch. Several other arches, including Partition, Navajo, Double O, and Private Arch, as well as the Dark Angel monolith and Fin Canyon, are accessed via the primitive loop trail and its spurs. Wall Arch, before its collapse in 2008, was also located in Devils Garden just north of Landscape Arch.

== Geology ==
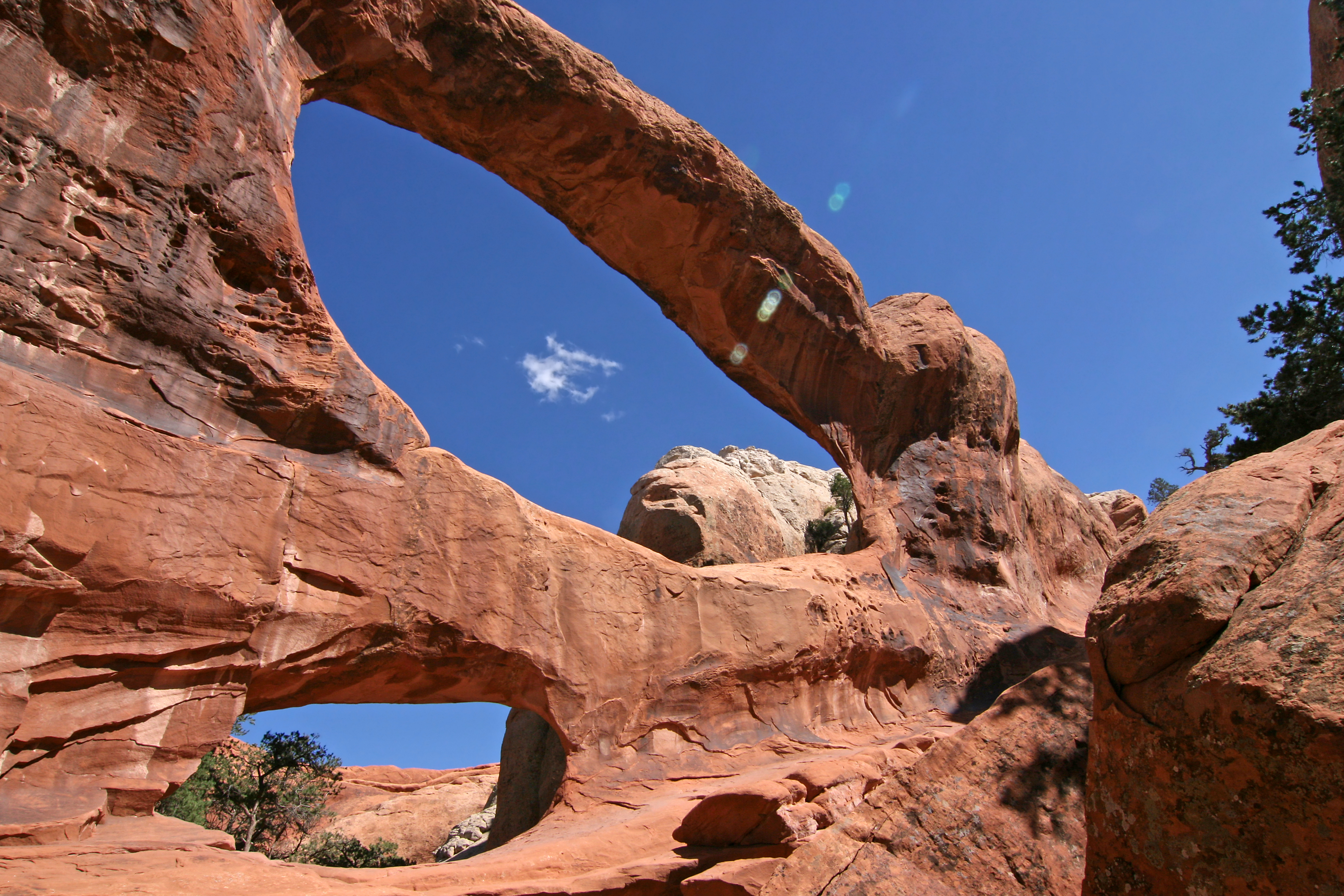
Double O Arch

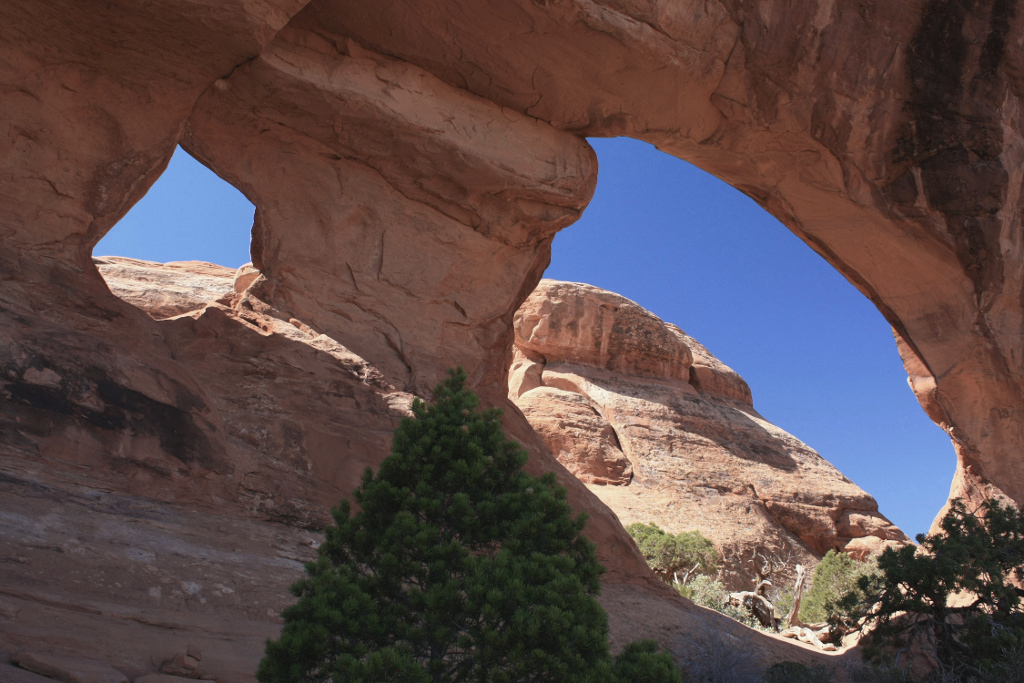
Partition Arch

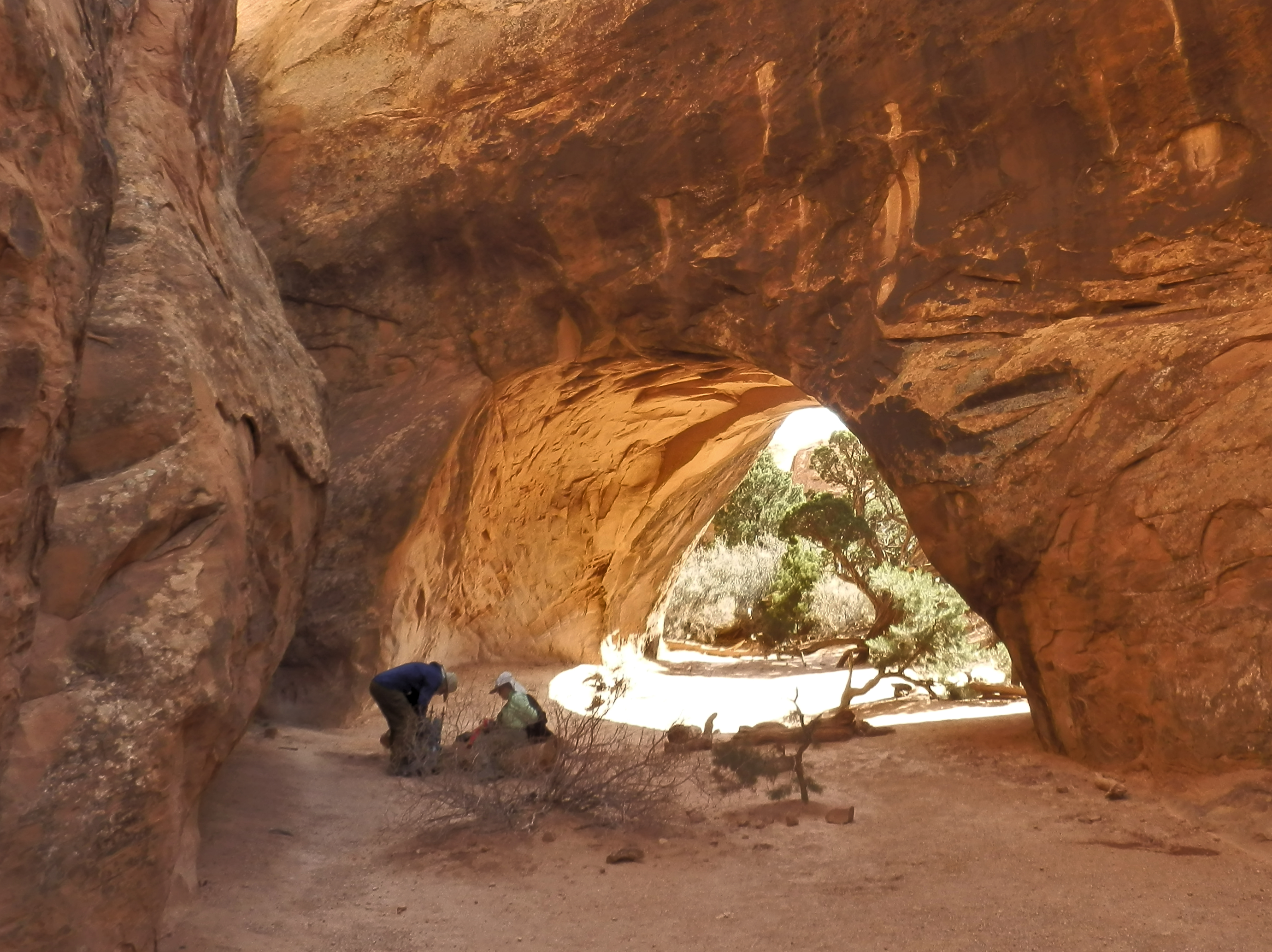
Navajo Arch

The Devils Garden Trail meanders between sheer walls of sandstone fins. The fins were created when vertical cracks in a thick layer of sandstone were eroded and widened by water—either scoured by runoff from rainfall and snow melt, or pried and exfoliated by ice expansion. These stone formations may only last a few thousand years—a short time on the geologic time scale. The events that led to the arches, fins, and other rock shapes began about 300 million years ago, when seas periodically covered the area. The seas became trapped in low-lying areas and then evaporated, leaving salt beds up to 5,000 ft (1,500 m) thick in some places. Sand, silt and clay subsequently accumulated on top of the salt deposits over millions of years. The uneven weight and pressure of these overlying sediments squeezed the salt into an anticline (a domed ridge). Overlying horizontal rock layers bulged upward and cracked vertically allowing rainwater to trickle down and dissolve the salt away.

As the salt receded, the overlying rock burden sank with it. Salt Valley, located to the immediate southwest, is an example of the resulting landform. At the edges of the valley, where Devils Garden is located, the cracked rock was slightly pulled apart. Rain and snow soaked into the vertical cracks, which dissolved the cementing minerals and loosened grains of sand to be carried away by running water. As the cracks widened, tall fins were left standing. Weak zones in fins were either dissolved by naturally occurring acids in rainwater or wedged apart by freezing and thawing water, and openings developed into the various arches seen presently.

Landscape Arch, one of the world’s longest natural arches, spans about 290 ft (88.4 m) according to laser rangefinder measurements made in 2004, yet is only about 6 ft (2 m) thick near its center. The arch was almost 11 ft (3 m) thick until September 1991 when a few small pieces began to fall. Within seconds, a 60 ft (20 m) long by about 5 ft (1.5 m) thick slab of rock dropped from the underside of the thinnest section. Some of the large boulders on the slope beneath the arch are remnants of this event.

== Flora and fauna ==
The dominant plant species are pinyon pines and junipers. Wildflower growth is highly variable each year, depending on precipitation levels, with April and May generally being the best months to see blooms, and early fall also good in years with many summer monsoons.

Mammals inhabiting the park include cougars, mule deer, desert bighorn sheep, red foxes, cottontail rabbits, kangaroo rats and other rodents. Reptiles include western collared lizards, northern whiptails, desert spiny lizards, and midget faded rattlesnakes.

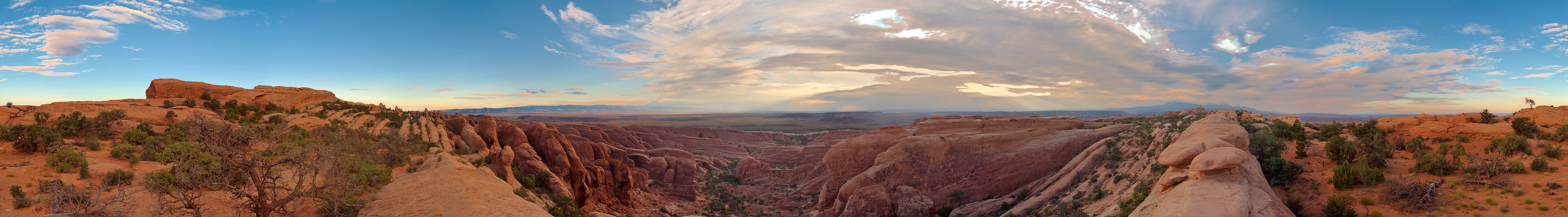
View from primitive trail
