= Savage Water =

1979 American horror film

- VHS cover
- Directed by: Paul W. Kener
- Written by: Kipp Boden
- Produced by: Paul W. Kener
- Starring: Bridget Agnew; Ron Berger; Gil Van Waggoner; Pat Comer
- Production companies: Talking Pictures, Inc.
- Release date: July 11, 1979
- Running time: 99 minutes
- Country: United States
- Language: English
- Budget: $500,000

Savage Water is a 1979 American thriller horror film co-produced and directed by Paul W. Kener and written by Kipp Boden. It stars Bridget Agnew, Ron Berger, Gil Van Waggoner, Pat Comer, Dewa DeAnne, Gene Eubanks, Kener, and Clayton King.

== Premise ==
A group of people are vacationing in the Grand Canyon, where they paddle through the Colorado River on a white water rafting tour run by a man named Dave Savage. As the trip goes on, the vacationers fall prey to a mysterious killer.

== Cast ==
- Gil Van Waggoner as Dave Savage
- Ron Berger as Doc Rogers
- Bridget Agnew as JoAnne
- Clayton King as Mike
- Mike Wackor as Fry
- Pat Comer as Darrell
- So Mickelson as Ivy
- Rashad Javeri as Mahomad
- Dawn DeAnne and Dewa DeAnne as Susie
- Valerie Kittel as Rhonda
- Gene Eubanks as Doug Farris
- Doug Jones as Dean Farris
- Doug Warr as Leo
- Raymond H. Smith as Judge

== Production ==
Savage Water was filmed on location in the Grand Canyon and along the Colorado River in Utah, between Lees Ferry and Lake Mead. Filming also took place in the Cataract Canyon between the cities of Moab and Hite, as well as at the Apache Motel in Moab and the Sandy, Utah Court House. Screenwriter Kipp Boden was an actual Utah river runner.

Savage Water was the last of four films produced by director Paul W. Kener's company Talking Pictures, Inc.

=== Music ===
The film's theme music was provided by Doug Warr, and Kener's wife Karen and her band the KC Classics performed the song "Sherrie", which is used in the film.

== Release ==
Savage Water premiered on July 11, 1979, at the Grand Cinema in Moab, Utah, on a double bill with The Wendigo, another film produced by Talking Pictures.

== Home media ==
In May 2013, the film was released on DVD by Vinegar Syndrome as a double feature with the 1971 film Death by Invitation.
