= Double O Arch =

Free-standing natural arch, Utah

- Rock arch
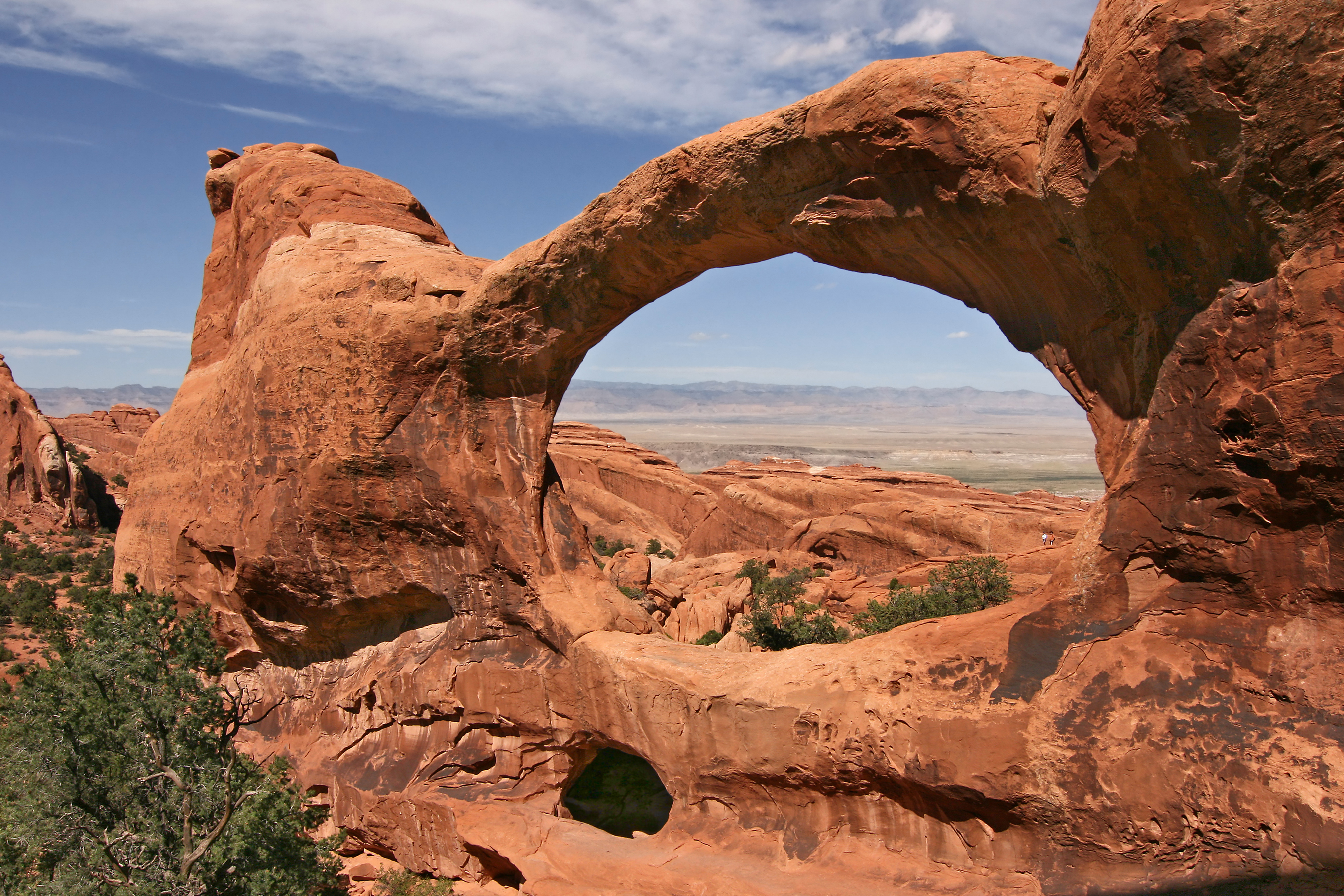
- View of Double O Arch

- Location within Utah
- Coordinates: 38°47′58″N 109°37′12″W
- Location: Arches National Park, Utah, United States

Dimensions
  - Width: 71 ft (22 m)
  - Height: 41 ft (12 m)
- Elevation: 5,522 ft (1,683 m)

Double O Arch is a large natural arch located in Arches National Park near Moab, Utah, in the United States. It is the second-largest arch within the Devils Garden area, after Landscape Arch.

== Background ==
The formation comprises two large arches stacked on top of each other in the same fin of rock. The larger "O" stretches 71 feet (22 meters) across while the smaller arch below measures approximately 21 feet (6.4 meters) across. The arch can be reached via a 4.1-mile (6.6-kilometer) strenuous round trip hike on the Devils Garden Trail.
