= Fairy Bridge =

Fairy Bridge may refer to:

- Fairy Bridge (Isle of Man), one of two locations on the Isle of Man in the British Isles
- Fairy Bridge (Isle of Skye), a storied stone bridge near Dunvegan in Scotland
- Xianren Bridge (Chinese: 仙人桥; lit. 'Fairy Bridge') in China, the world's largest natural arch
