= Paul Kiener =

American film director, producer, and screenwriter (died 2020)

Paul Kiener (June 4, 1946 - July 18, 2020), sometimes credited as Paul W. Kener, was an American film director, film producer, screenwriter, and cinematographer.

== Early life and career ==
Kiener grew up in Salt Lake City, Utah. He attended Brooks Institute of Photography, and earned an award for filmmaking there in 1967. He later served in the United States National Guard, and produced training and promotional films for the National Guard forces of Utah, California, and Texas.

He served as a cameraman on the 1971 film Toklat. He made his feature directorial debut with the 1974 film The Streak Car Company. He was also the director of photography for Wendigo (1978), and directed Savage Water (1979), the documentary The Horrors of War (1992), and Cataract Gold (2017). He died on July 18, 2020.
