= Arthur Taylor House (Moab, Utah) =

- U.S. National Register of Historic Places
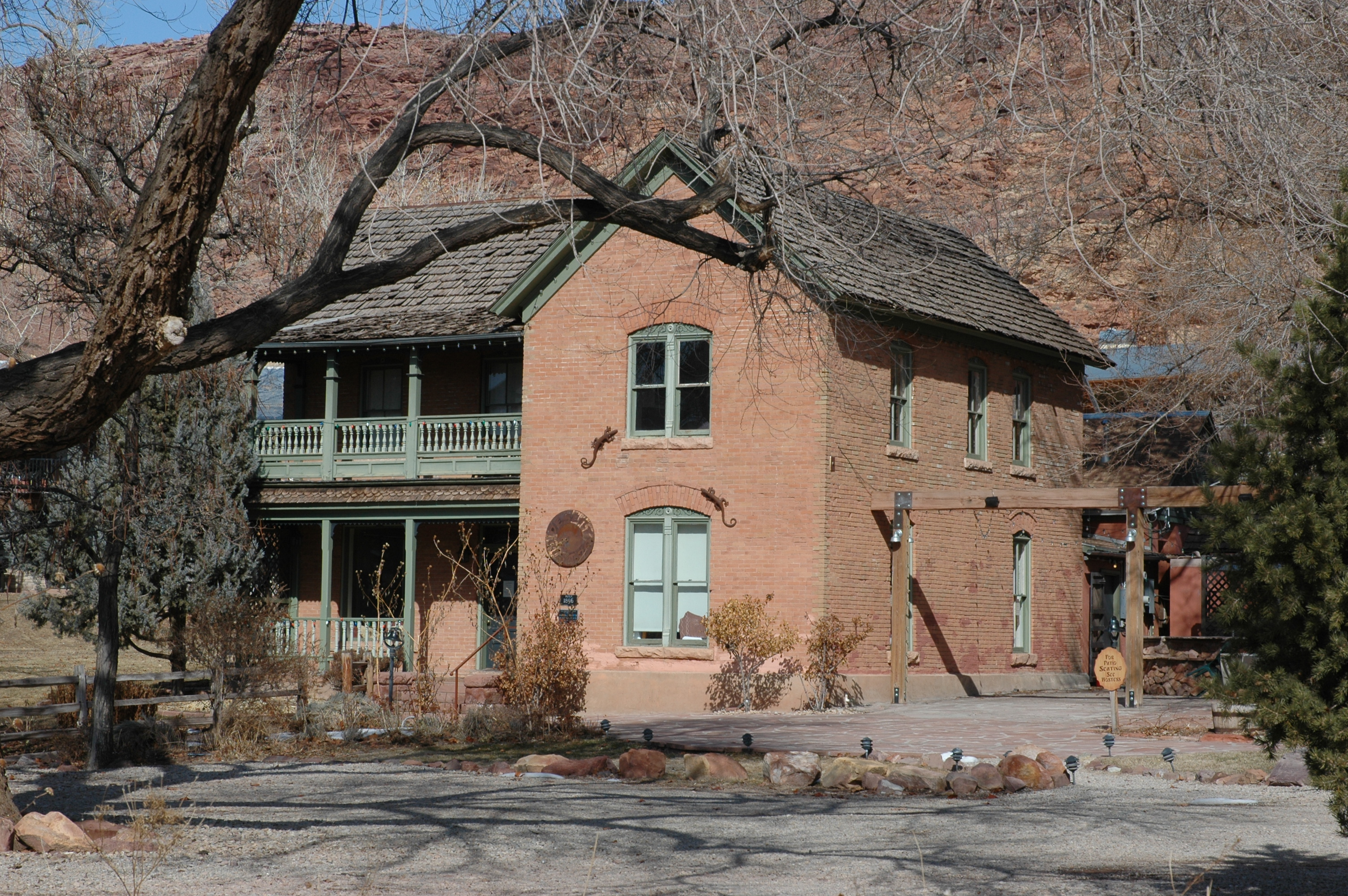
- The house in 2010

- Location within Utah Location within the United States
- Location: U.S. 163, Moab, Utah
- Coordinates: 38°35′34″N 109°33′46″W
- Area: less than one acre
- Built: 1894
- Built by: Elmer Taylor
- Architectural style: Stick-Eastlake
- NRHP reference No.: 80003908
- Added to NRHP: February 28, 1980

The Arthur Taylor House is a historic two-story house in Moab, Utah. It was built in 1894 for the Taylor family, who arrived in Moab as cattle ranchers in 1881 and switched to sheep farming after neighboring ranchers kept stealing their cattle. Arthur's brother Elmer built this house with local bricks, with a porch and balcony designed in the Stick-Eastlake style. Inside, the walls were painted by Carter Brothers, a firm based in Provo. The house was inherited by Arthur's brother Lester, and it was later remodelled as a restaurant. It has been listed on the National Register of Historic Places since February 28, 1980.
