= Kolob Arch =

Natural rock arch in Utah, United States

- Rock arch
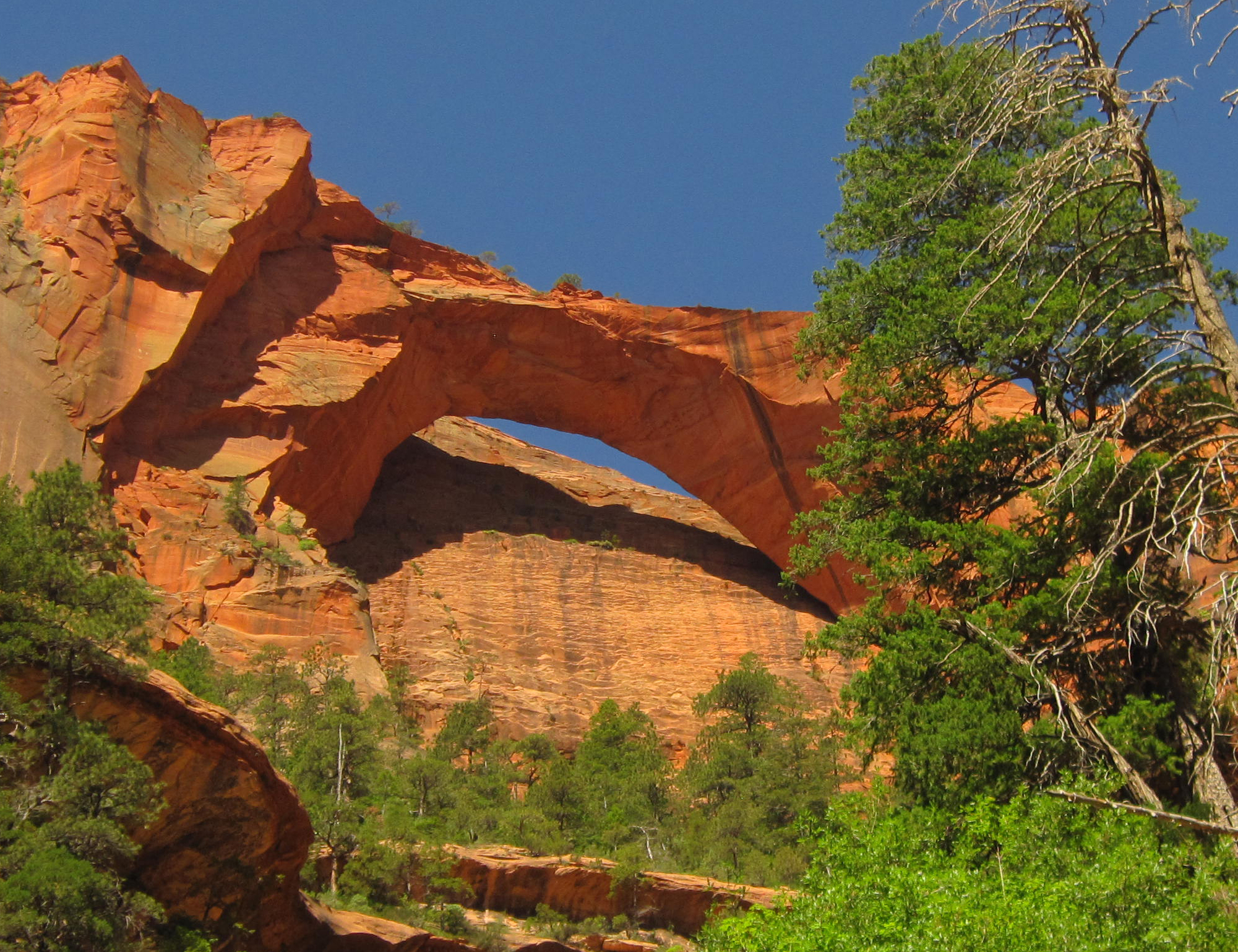
- View of Kolob Arch

- Location within Utah Location within the United States
- Coordinates: 37°25′25″N 113°09′28″W
- Location: Zion National Park, Utah, United States

Dimensions
  - Length: 287.4 ft (87.6 m)
  - Width: 35 ft (11 m)
- Elevation: 5,906 ft (1,800 m)

Kolob Arch is a natural arch in Zion National Park, Utah, United States. According to the Natural Arch and Bridge Society (NABS), it is the sixth-longest natural arch in the world. In 2006, the Society measured the span at 287.4 ± 2 feet (87.6 m), which is slightly shorter than Landscape Arch in Arches National Park. Differences in measuring technique or definitions could produce slightly different results and change this ranking.

== Access ==
Kolob Arch can be reached via one of two hiking trails, either of which is approximately seven miles (11 km) long and results in a round trip of fourteen miles (23 km). The arch can also be reached from Ice Box Canyon, a canyoneering route in this section of Zion National Park. The arch is high above the ground and frames a cliffside.
