= Wall Arch =

Former natural arch in Arches National Park in Grand County, Utah, United States

Coordinates: 38.7925°N 109.6066°W

- Interactive map of Wall Arch
- Location: Arches National Park, Utah, U.S.
- Geology: Entrada Sandstone (Slick Rock member)
- Elevation: 5,387 ft (1,642 m)

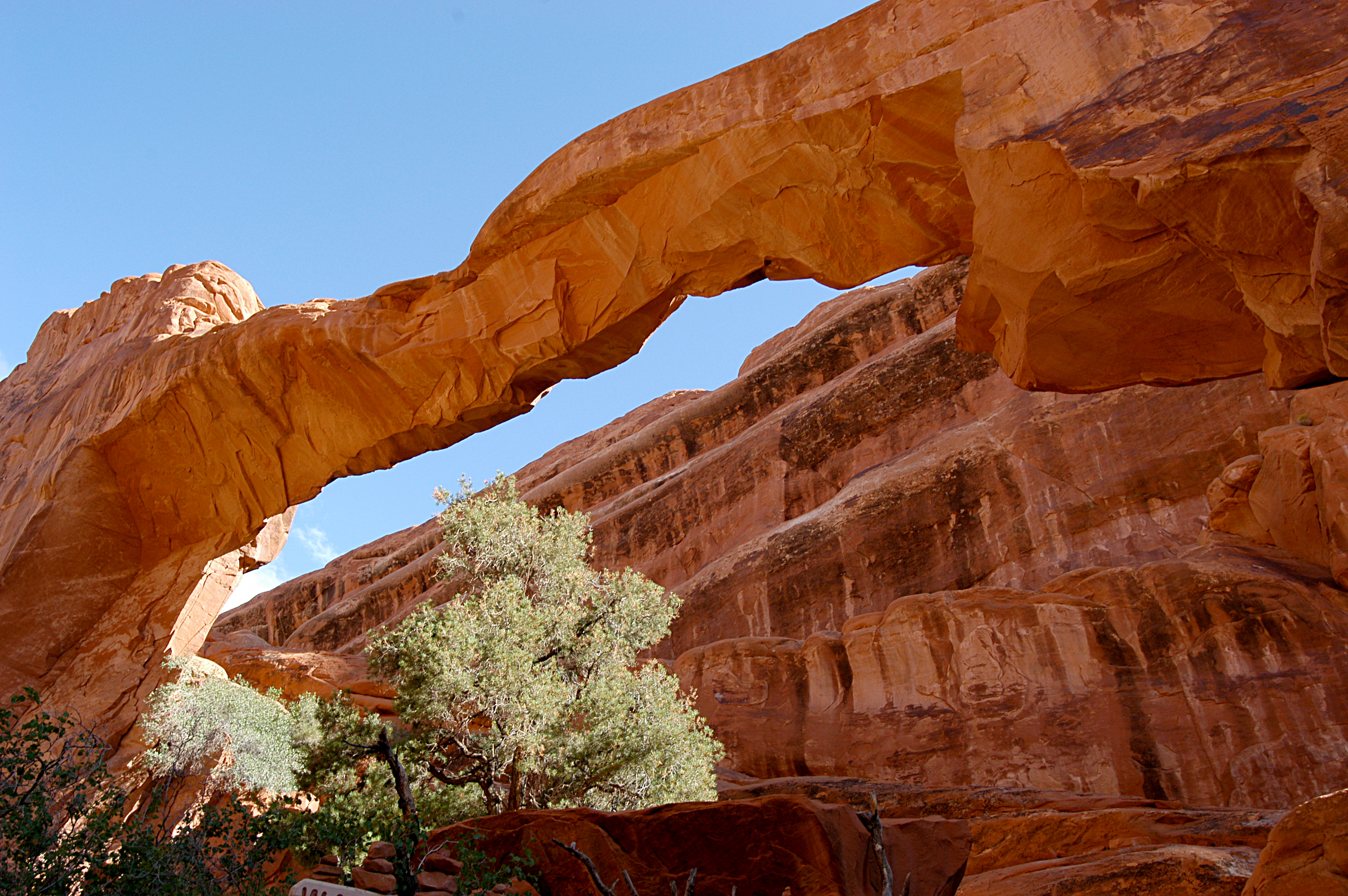
Wall Arch in Arches National Park in 2003, before its 2008 collapse

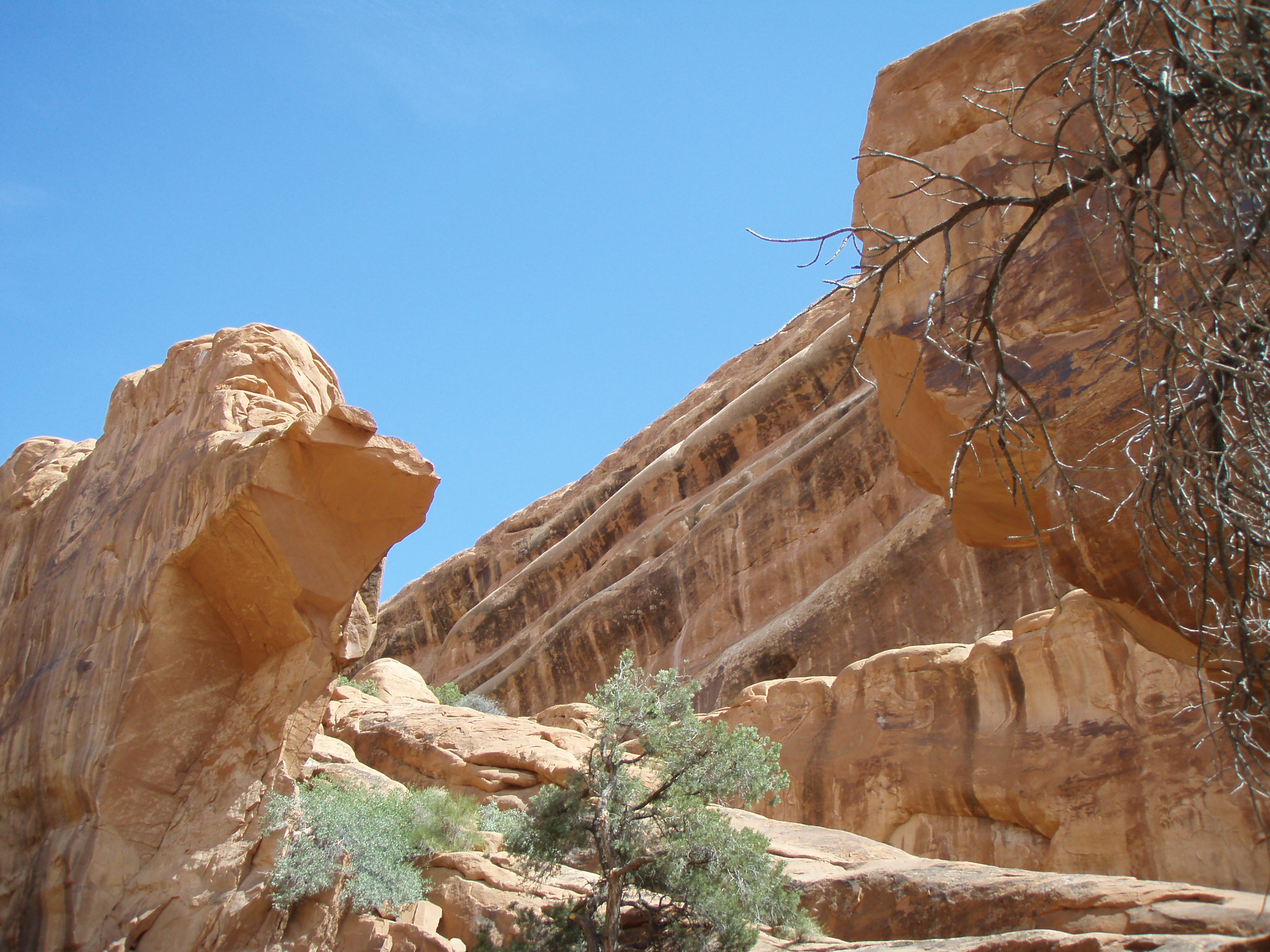
Wall Arch within days after the collapse

Wall Arch was a natural sandstone arch in Arches National Park in southeastern Utah, United States. Before its collapse in 2008, it was ranked 12th in size among the park's over 2,000 arches. At its largest, the opening underneath the span was 71 feet (22 m) wide by 33.5 feet (10 m) high. It consisted of Entrada Sandstone, specifically the member known as Slick Rock. Wall Arch was first reported and named in 1948 by Lewis T. McKinney.

Wall Arch collapsed some time between the night of August 4 and the morning of August 5, 2008, temporarily blocking Devils Garden Trail. No one observed the fall. It was the first collapse of a major arch in the park since sections of Landscape Arch fell in 1991. Officials from the National Park Service and Utah Geological Survey visited the site of the collapsed sandstone arch on August 7 and noted stress fractures in the remaining formation which may cause collapses in the future.
