= Moab LDS Church =

- U.S. National Register of Historic Places
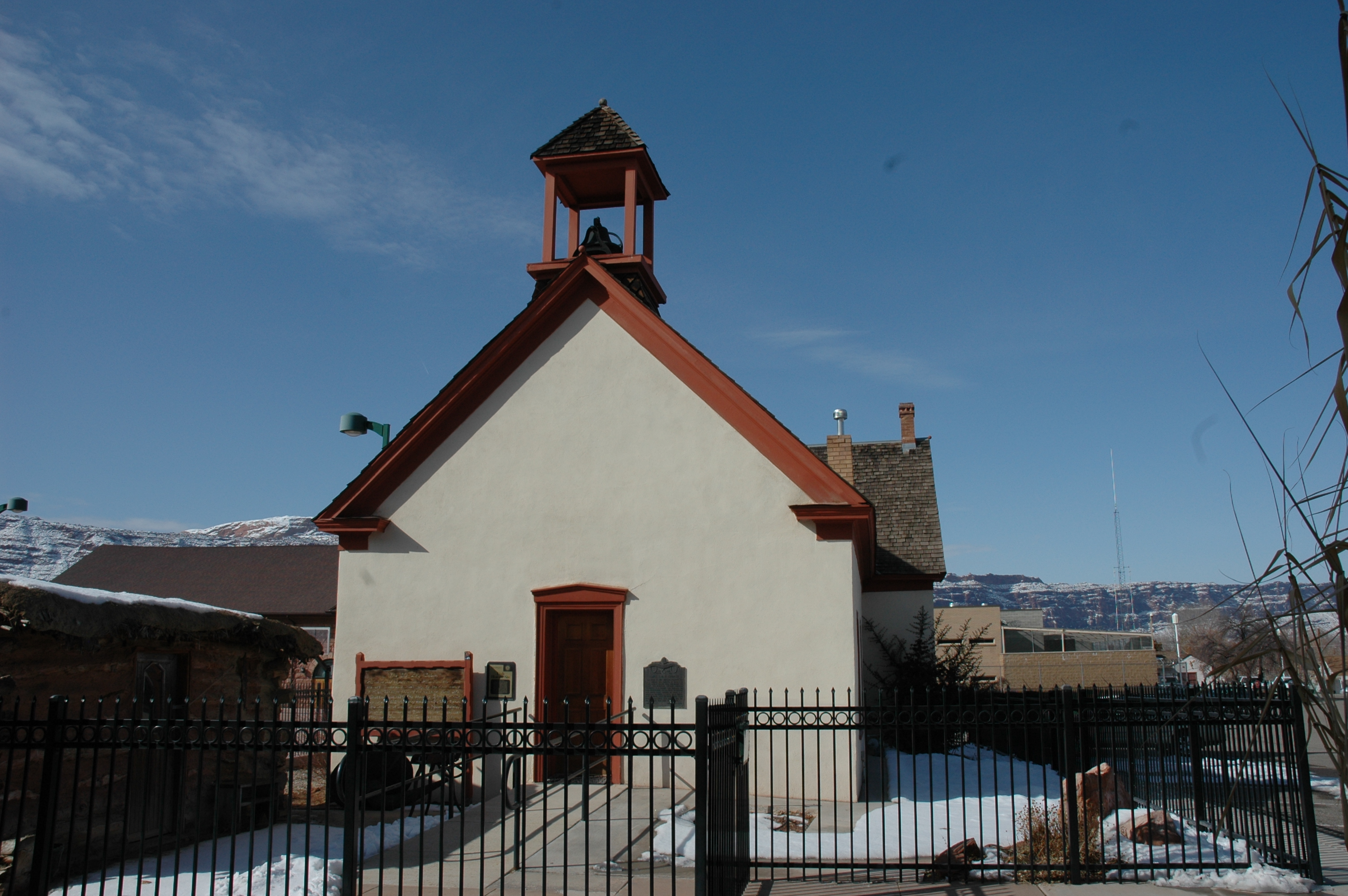
- The church in 2010

- Location within Utah Location within the United States
- Location: Off U.S. 160, Moab, Utah
- Coordinates: 38°34′27″N 109°32′43″W
- Area: less than one acre
- Built: 1889
- Architectural style: Greek Revival, Late Greek Revival
- NRHP reference No.: 80003907
- Added to NRHP: November 28, 1980

The Moab LDS Church is a historic church in Moab, Utah. It was built with adobe for the Church of Jesus Christ of Latter-day Saints in 1888–1889, on land that belonged to Leonidas L. Crapo. The local bishop, Randolph H. Stewart, had acquired the land in 1884, and he later sold it to his second counselor, Orlando W. Warner. The church was designed in the Greek Revival style, and it was later stuccoed. The building was deeded to the Grand County School District in 1925. By 1937, the Daughters of Utah Pioneers began holding their meetings in the old church. It has been listed on the National Register of Historic Places since November 28, 1980.
