= John Henry Shafer House =

- U.S. National Register of Historic Places
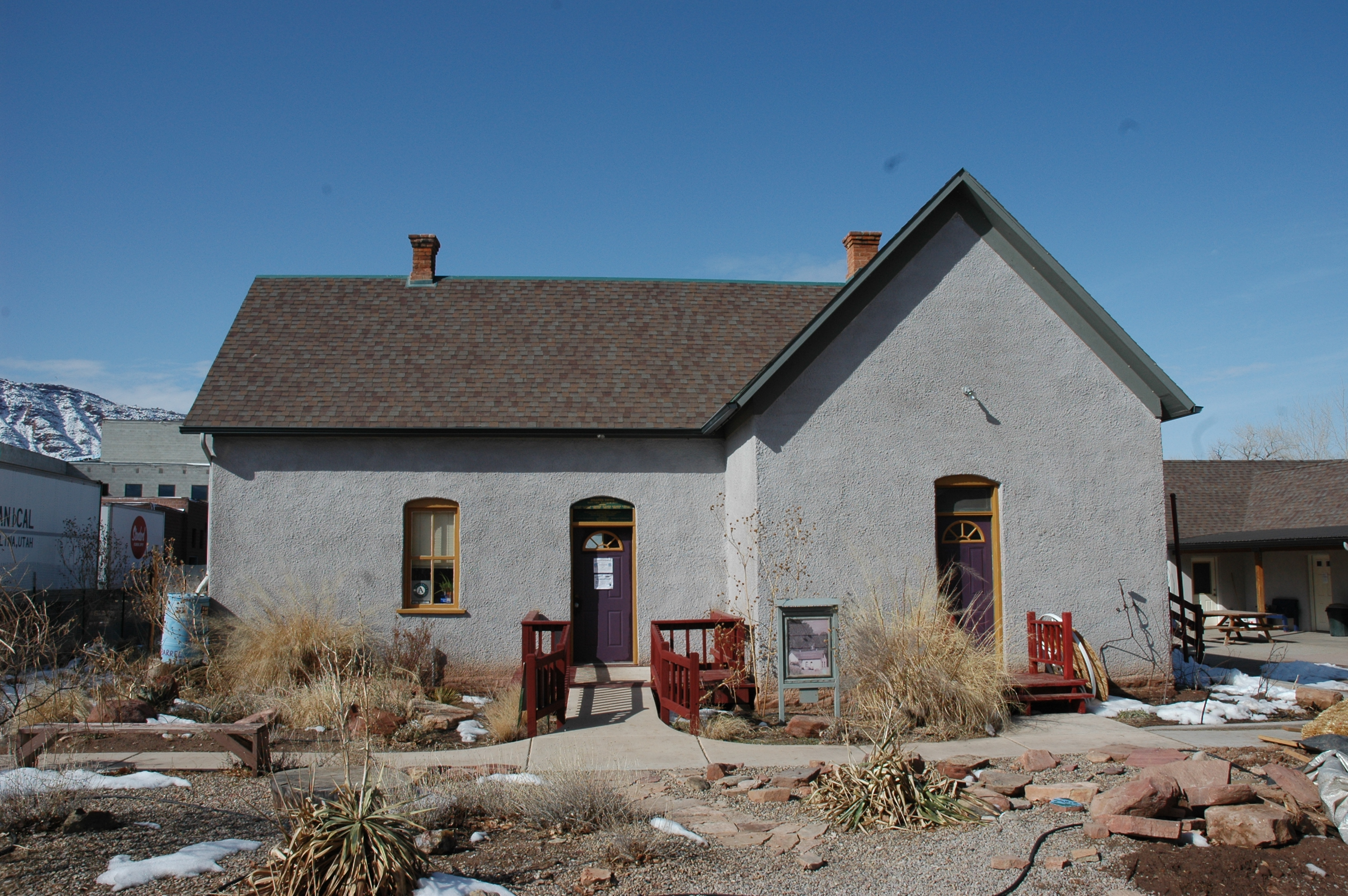
- The house in 2010

- Location within Utah Location within the United States
- Location: 500 South 400 East, Moab, Utah
- Coordinates: 38°33′54″N 109°32′36″W
- Area: less than one acre
- Built: 1884
- Architectural style: Victorian Eclectic
- NRHP reference No.: 01000472
- Added to NRHP: May 2, 2001

The John Henry Shafer House is a historic house in Moab, Utah. It was built in 1884 for John Henry Shafer, a member of the Church of Jesus Christ of Latter-day Saints who moved to Moab from Salt Lake City with other Mormon settlers in 1878. Shafer married Mary Forbush in 1881, and they lived in this house, designed in the Victorian Eclectic style, until she died in 1889. He later married Sariah Eveline Johnson. Shafer was a Republican, and he served as the first member of the Utah House of Representatives from Grand County, Utah. The house was deeded to John Tangren, an immigrant from Sweden, in 1891; he lived here with his wife, Ester Alien, who was the president of the local Relief Society. It later purchased by two ranchers: Dale M. Parriot in 1912, and Richard L. Holyoak in 1941. The house has been listed on the National Register of Historic Places since May 2, 2001.
