= Buliu River =

Location
- Country: China

Physical characteristics
- Source: Yuli River
- 2nd source: Anxiang River
- Source confluence
  - location: Lingyun County, Guangxi, China
  - coordinates: 24°30′17.5″N 106°37′15.9″E
- Mouth: Hongshui River
  - location: Tian'e County, Guangxi, China
  - coordinates: 25°01′55.2″N 107°02′19.9″E
- Length: 183 km (114 mi)
- Basin size: 2,775 km^{2} (1,071 sq mi)

Buliu River (Chinese: 布柳河; pinyin: bùliǔhé) or Buliuhe is a river beginning with the convergence of the Yuli and Anxiang rivers in Lingyun County and flowing a northeasterly direction before ultimately joining the Hongshui River just before the Longtan Dam. It is crossed by the Xianren Bridge (仙人桥; 'Fairy Bridge'), a rock formation representing the world's longest natural bridge, as well as the Buliuhe River Bridge, one of the highest bridges in the world.

The river's name comes from the Zhuang words "bu" meaning natural spring, and "liu" meaning alcohol, alluding to a legend asserting that the river was formed by a spring of alcohol.
