= Star Hall (Moab, Utah) =

- U.S. National Register of Historic Places
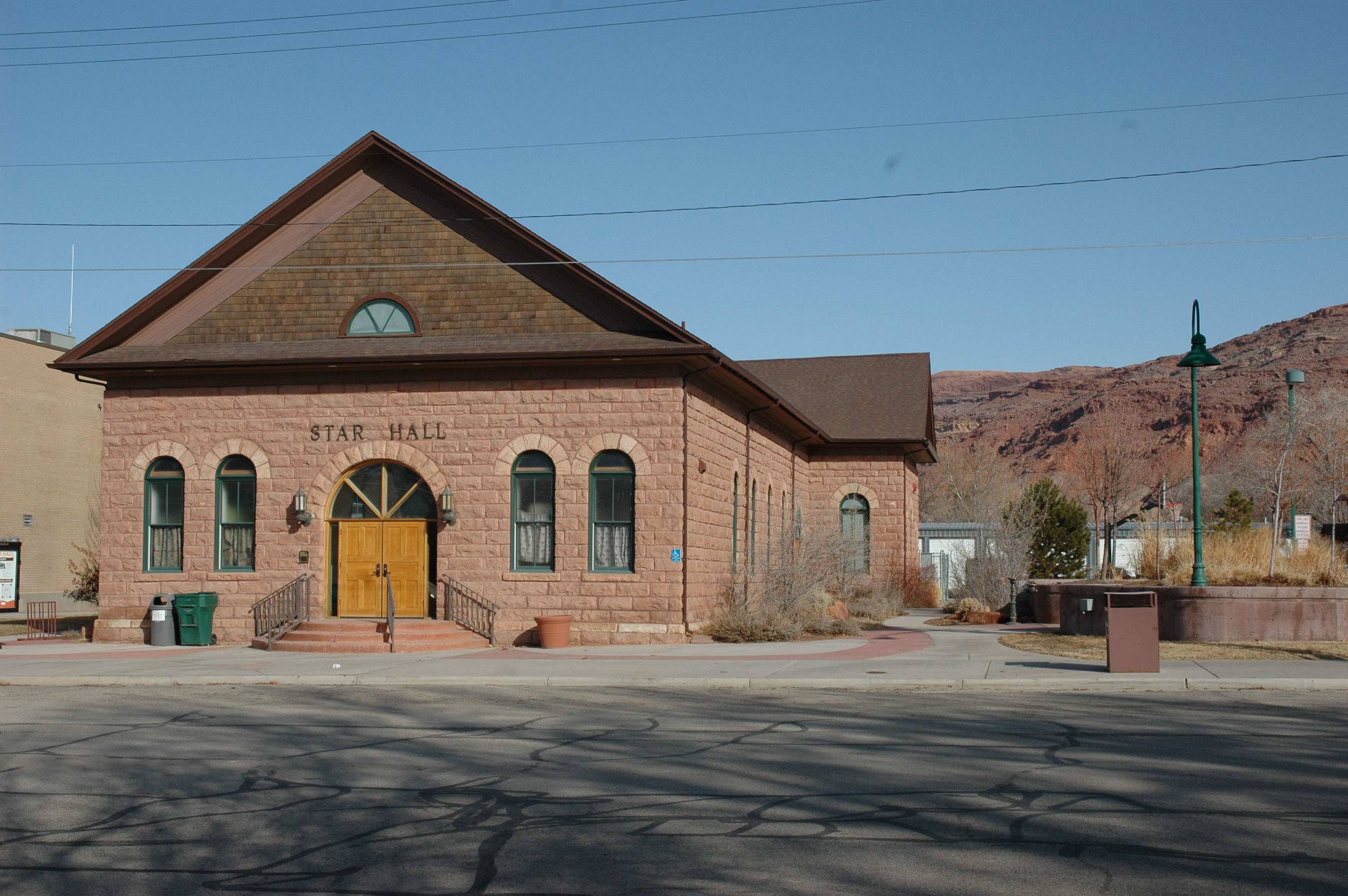
- The building in 2010

- Location within Utah Location within the United States
- Location: 159 East Center Street, Moab, Utah
- Coordinates: 38°34′25″N 109°32′48″W
- Area: less than one acre
- Built: 1906
- Built by: Steve Day
- Architect: Will Shafer
- Stonemasons: Will Bliss, A.M. Stocks, Bill Hawks
- Architectural style: Richardsonian Romanesque
- NRHP reference No.: 93000416
- Added to NRHP: May 14, 1993

Star Hall is a historic building in Moab, Utah. It was built in 1905-1906 by the Church of Jesus Christ of Latter-day Saints for the Moab Ward after Bishop Randolph H. Stewart and second counselor Orlando W. Warner purchased the land from Leonard Leonidas Crapo, and it was designed in the Richardsonian Romanesque style. The building was later acquired by the Grand County School District. It has been listed on the National Register of Historic Places since May 14, 1993.
