= Fin (geology) =

A fin is a geological formation that is a narrow, residual wall of hard sedimentary rock that remains standing after surrounding rock has been eroded away along parallel joints or fractures. Fins are formed when a narrow butte or plateau develops many vertical, parallel cracks. There are two main modes of following erosion. The first is when water flows along joints and fractures and opens them wider and wider, eventually causing erosion. The second is where the rock type (stratum) is harder and more erosion resistant than neighboring rocks, causing the weaker rock to fall away.

Fins are considered an intermediary stage of many other erosional geologic features like windows, arches, and hoodoos. The formation of such features is a simplified four-step process. The first step is uplift that results in deep parallel, vertical fractures within the plateau. The second step is weathering and erosion that enlarges the fractures, producing fins. The third step is erosion attacking fins from below, causing windows and arches. The fourth step is continuing weathering that enlarges holes, causing arches and holes to collapse, creating spires or hoodoos.

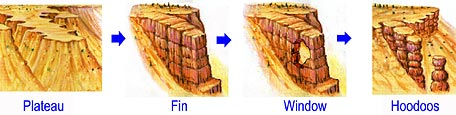
Progressive erosion producing plateau, fin, window (or arch), and hoodoos

== Sandstones ==
Fins will form typically in sedimentary rocks, mainly sandstone. Sandstone is bedded, which provides zones of weakness, along which weathering and erosion takes place. Iron oxide and calcium carbonate cemented sandstones produce fins. These are typically seen as weak cements, compared to the erosion resistant silica cement, but in arid and semi-arid regions they are much more resistant. This is due to the lack of water in these regions that would otherwise chemically weather iron oxide cements and calcium carbonate cements.

Because sandstones are bedded sedimentary rocks, they possess prominent joints and bedding planes which provides many channels for drainage. When drainage patterns follow these paths, it creates angular, dendritic patterns within topography. Lack of soil cover in these dry regions gives joints maximum control over drainage systems resulting in angular patterns, striking topography, and steep slopes.

== Occurrence ==
Fins commonly occur in arid to semi-arid regions, like south western United States. Arches National Park in Utah is home to Navajo Sandstone, an iron oxide cement sandstone, and displays all steps of the fin to spire erosion and formation process. The Entrada Sandstone formation, a calcium carbonate cement sandstone, can also be found within this region, along with Wyoming, Colorado, New Mexico, and Arizona. Little Finland in Nevada owes its name to the red Aztec sandstone fins located there.

== Gallery ==
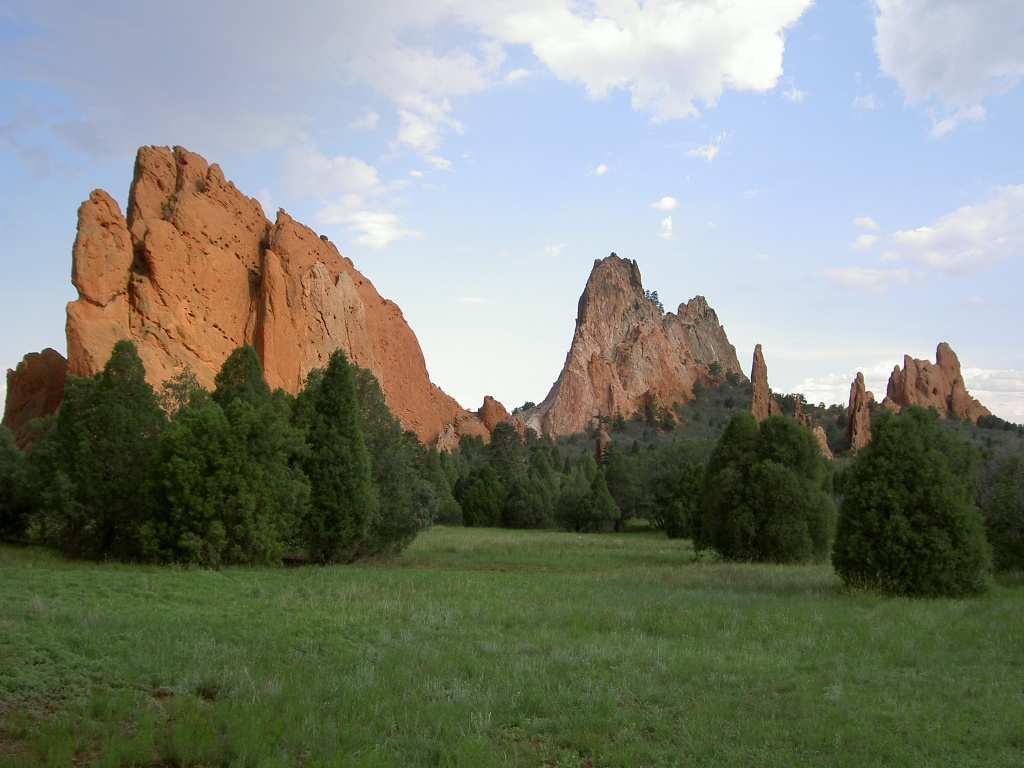
A cluster of fins at Garden of the Gods, Colorado Springs, Colorado, US.

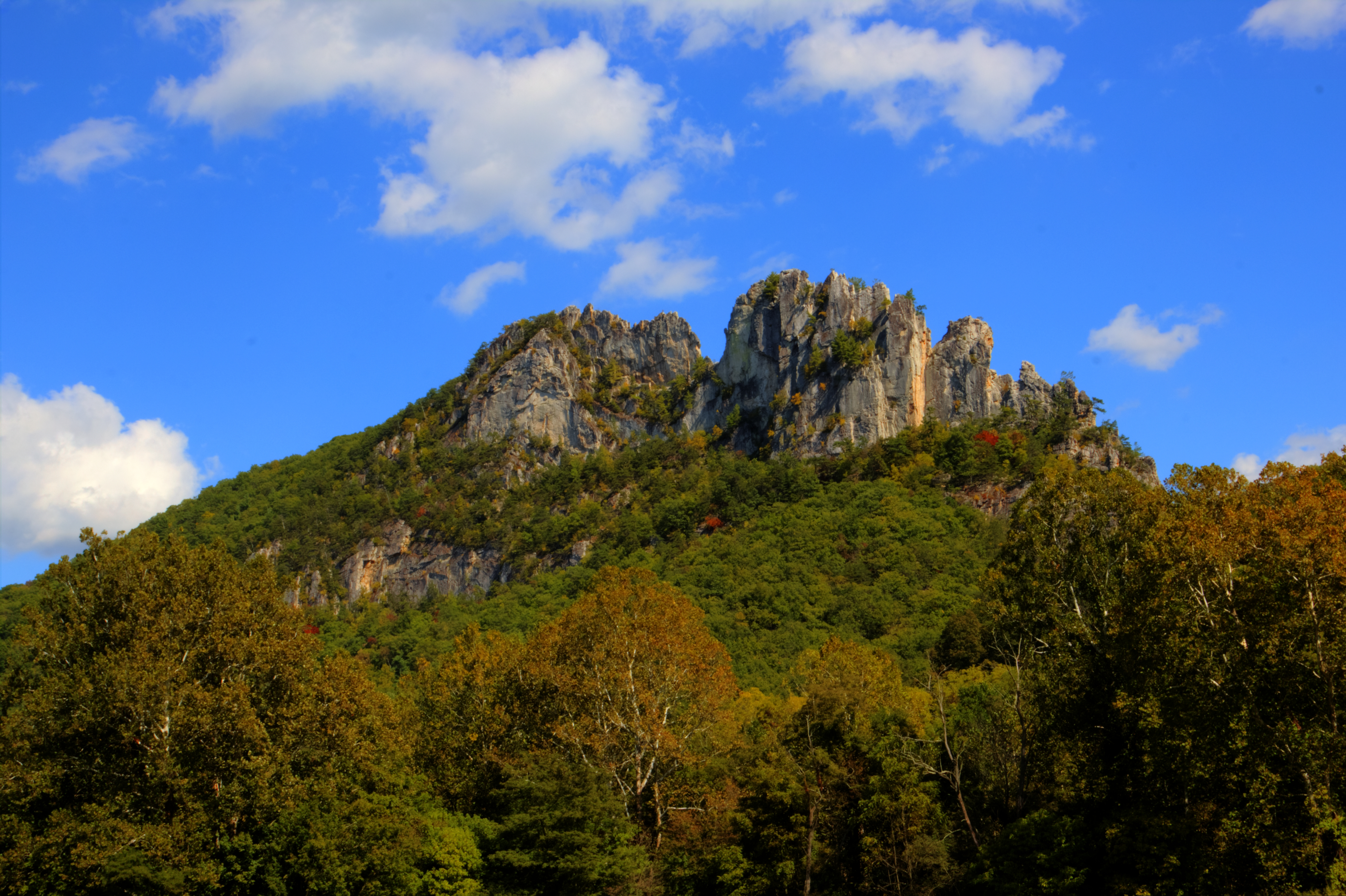
Seneca Rocks, a prominent single fin in eastern West Virginia, US.

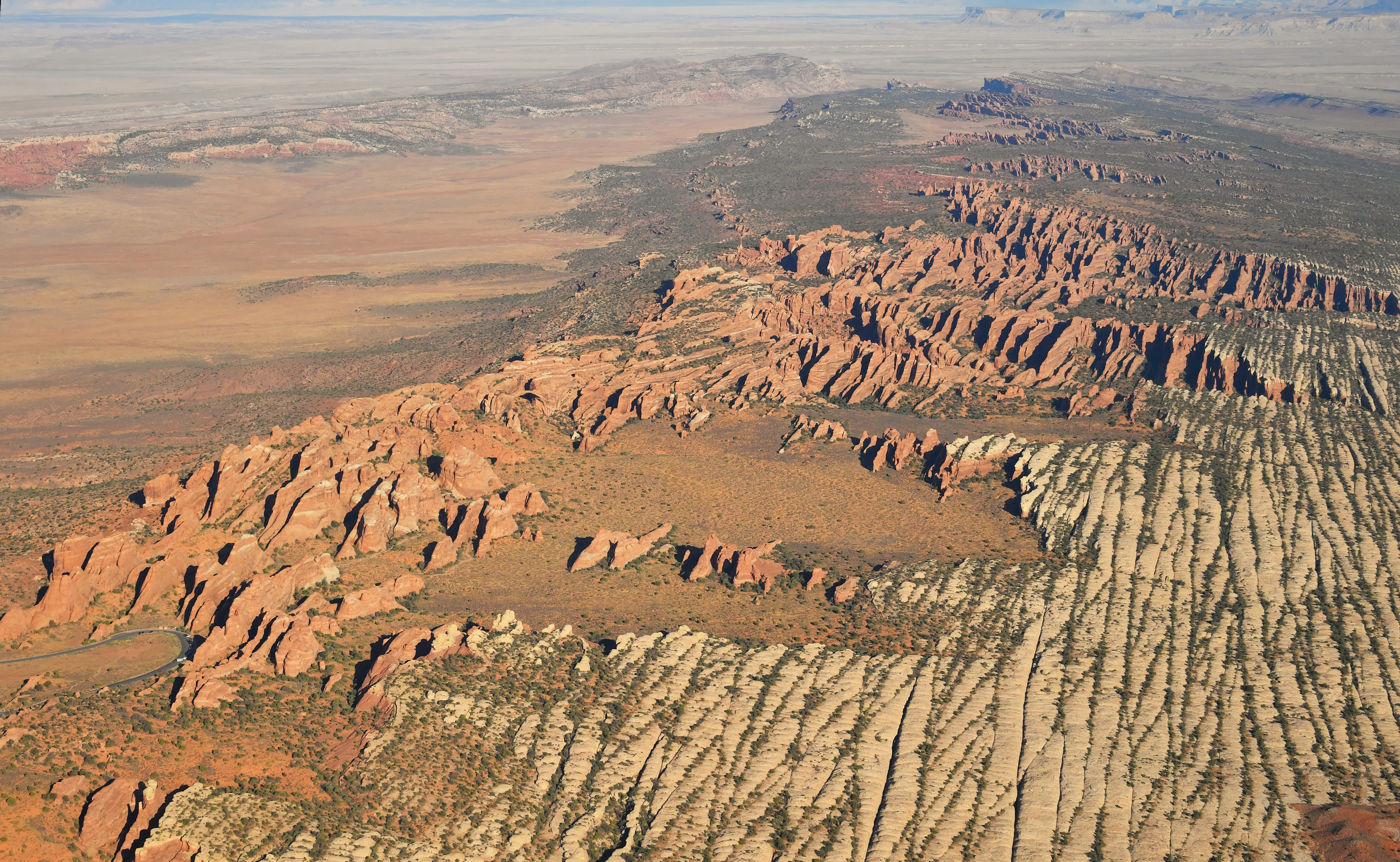
Aerial view of innumerable rock fins at the Devils Garden area of Arches National Park, Utah, US.

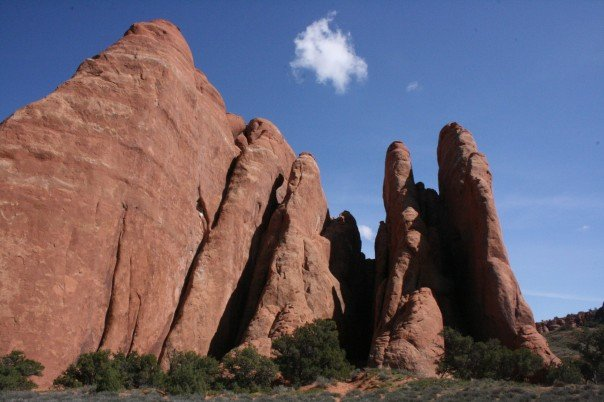
Rock fins at Devils Garden, Arches National Park.

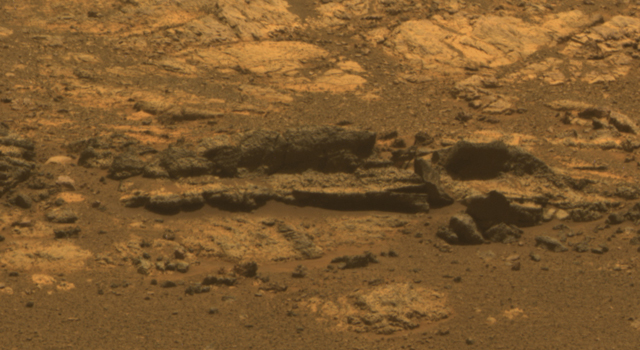
Fins are not restricted to the Earth: Matijevic Hill, Mars
