= Landscape Arch =

Natural rock arch in Arches National Park, Utah, US

- Rock arch
- View of Landscape Arch

- Location within Utah Location within the United States
- Coordinates: 38°44′34″N 109°29′38″W
- Location: Arches National Park, Utah, United States

Dimensions
  - Length: 290 ft (88 m)
  - Width: 18 ft (5.5 m)
  - Height: 77.5 ft (23.6 m)
- Elevation: 4,607 ft (1,404 m)

Landscape Arch is a natural arch in Arches National Park, Utah, United States. It is among the longest natural rock arches in the world.

== Description ==
The arch is among many in the Devils Garden area in the north of the park. Landscape Arch was named by Frank Beckwith who explored the area in the winter of 1933–1934 as the leader of an Arches National Monument scientific expedition. The arch can be reached by a 0.8 mi (1.3 km) graded gravel trail.

The Natural Arch and Bridge Society (NABS) considers Landscape Arch the fifth longest natural arch in the world, after four arches in China. In 2004, the span of Landscape Arch was measured at 290.1 ft (88.4 m), ±0.8 ft (0.24 m), with a height of 77.5 ft (23.6 m). NABS measured the span of the slightly shorter Kolob Arch in Zion National Park at 287 ft (87 m) in 2006.

The most recent recorded rockfall events occurred in the 1990s when one large slab fell in 1991 and then two additional large rockfalls occurred in 1995. Since the rockfalls, the trail beneath the arch has been closed.

== See also ==
- List of longest natural arches
- Delicate Arch
- Durdle Door
- Wall Arch
- Xianren Bridge
