= Death by Invitation =

- Theatrical release poster
- Directed by: Ken Friedman
- Written by: Ken Friedman
- Produced by: Mitchell Block
- Starring: Shelby Leverington; Aaron Phillips; Norman Parker
- Cinematography: Alec Hirschfeld
- Production company: Kirt Films
- Release date: October 20, 1971
- Running time: 81 minutes
- Country: United States
- Language: English

Death by Invitation is a 1971 American horror film written and directed by Ken Friedman and produced by Mitchell Block. It stars Shelby Leverington, Aaron Phillips, and Norman Parker.

== Premise ==
Lise, a woman from the Colonial era who was burned at the stake for the crime of witchcraft, is reincarnated and seeks vengeance upon the descendants of those who killed her.

== Cast ==
- Shelby Leverington as Lise
- Aaron Phillips as Peter Vroot
- Norman Parker as Jake (credited as Norman Paige)

== Home media ==
In May 2013, Death by Invitation was released on DVD by Vinegar Syndrome as a double feature with the 1979 film Savage Water. Vinegar Syndrome also released Death by Invitation on DVD as a double feature with the 1962 film The Dungeon of Harrow.
