= Courthouse Wash Pictographs =

- U.S. National Register of Historic Places
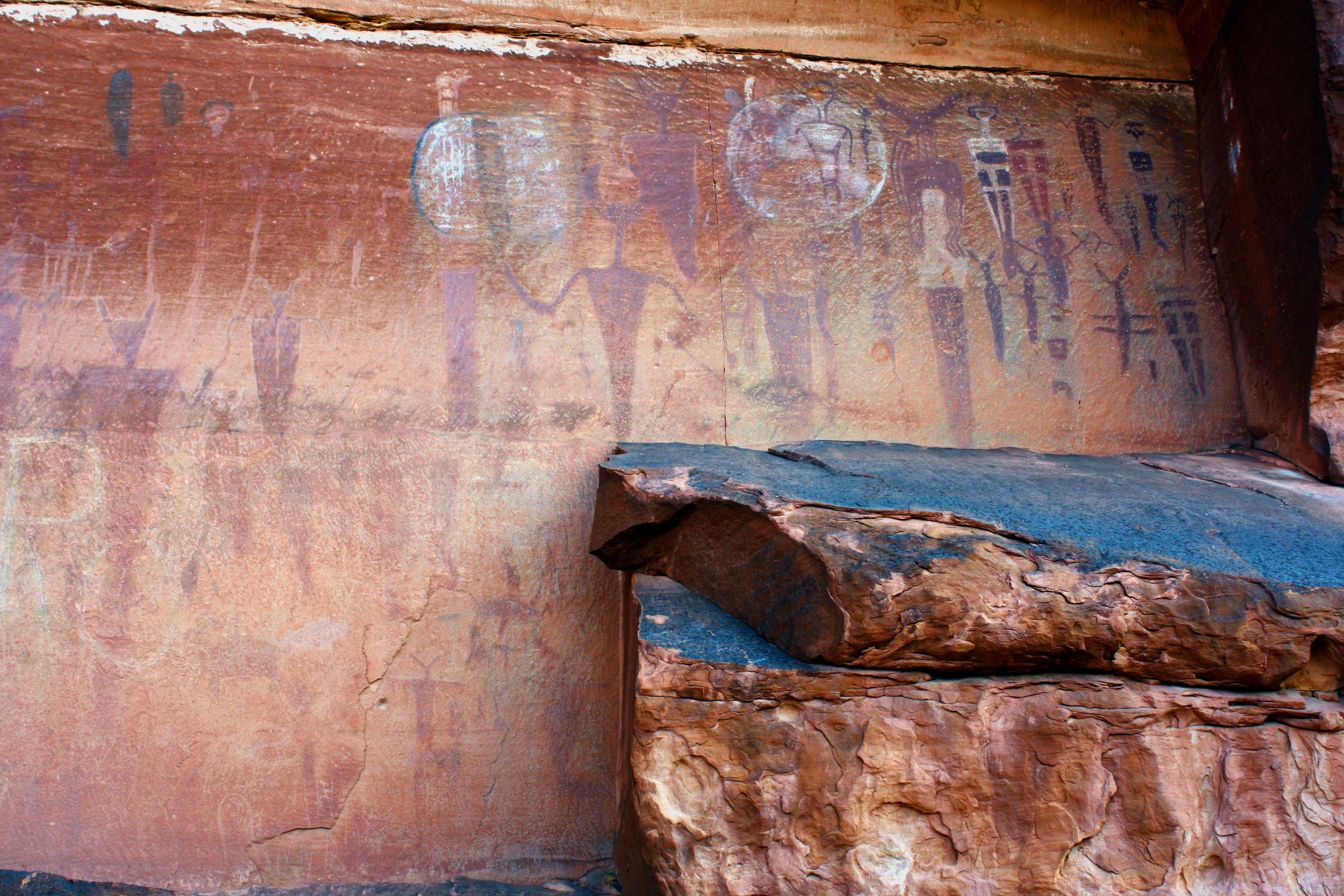
- Courthouse Wash Pictographs, May 2009

- Location within Utah Location within the United States
- Nearest city: Moab, Utah; United States
- Coordinates: 38°36′26″N 109°34′47″W
- Area: 0.1 acres (0.040 ha)
- NRHP reference No.: 76000207
- Added to NRHP: April 1, 1976

The Courthouse Wash Pictographs are a series of large pictographs created over a long period of time, located on a sheltered sandstone wall at the mouth of Courthouse Wash, Arches National Park in Grand County, Utah, United States, just north of Moab, that is listed on the National Register of Historic Places (NRHP).

== Description ==
The series of images depict a variety of figures, many of them anthropomorphic and measuring up to 5 feet (1.5 m) in height. The Courthouse wash site is located near the junction of Courthouse Wash with the Colorado River, extending over a 100-meter section of cliff base. The pictographs include painted figures resembling those found in Horseshoe Canyon in Canyonlands National Park, 35 miles (56 km) to the west. Other figures, including those of animals, have been incised by removal of the rock's covering of desert varnish. The painted figures follow the Barrier Canyon Style and are believed to be between 1500 and 4000 years old. The incised figures are attributed to the Fremont culture and are dated to about 1000-1200 AD. Figures mounted on horseback were created in historical times since the 16th century introduction of horses and are attributed to Navajo or Ute artists.

The site is accessible from a footpath, 0.5 miles (0.80 km) from U.S. Route 191 northeast of Moab. The site was extensively vandalized in 1980, but has been conserved.

The Courthouse Wash site was placed on the NRHP on April 1, 1976.

== See also ==
- National Register of Historic Places listings in Grand County, Utah
- National Register of Historic Places listings in Arches National Park
