= Moab Cabin =

- U.S. National Register of Historic Places
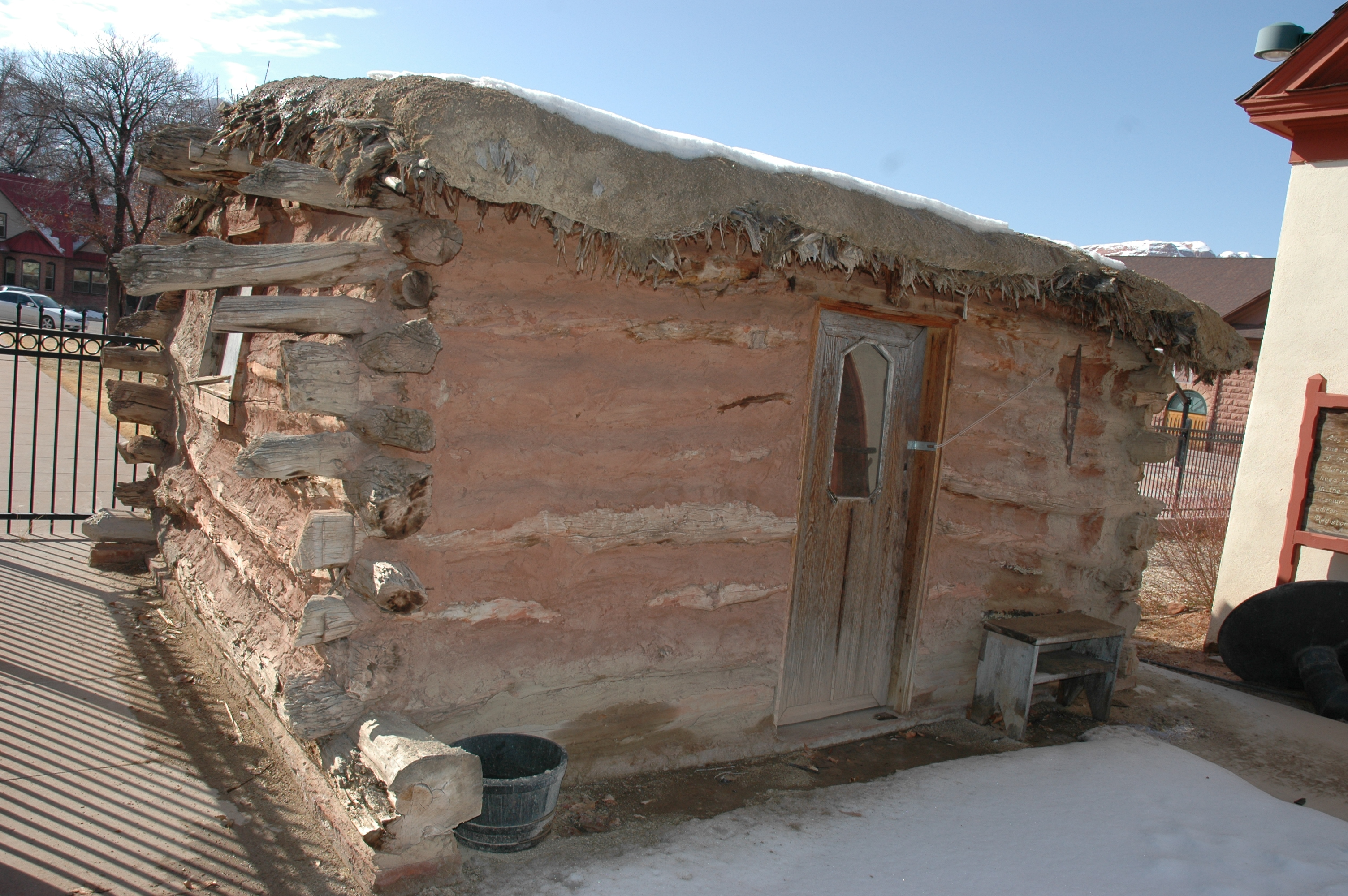

- Location within Utah
- Location: E. 1st St., Moab, Utah
- Coordinates: 38°34′22″N 109°32′46″W
- Area: less than one acre
- Built: 1893
- Built by: Jackson, John
- NRHP reference No.: 80003906
- Added to NRHP: February 14, 1980

The Moab Cabin, on East. 1st St. in Moab, Utah, was built around 1893. It was listed on the National Register of Historic Places in 1980.

It was built of rough-hewn logs uneven notching at the corners, and with mud chinking. It has a flat roof of parallel logs with branches and mud added, and, in 1980, with living plants. It's NRHP nomination describes its significance: "The Moab Cabin is important to the city of Moab because it is a tangible link with the community's earlier days, and because the history of the cabin in many ways perfectly reflects the progress of history in many of the major economic and social events that have been important to Southeastern Utah and the American West in the last 100 years. Built by Mormon pioneers, used by cowboys who served the area's cattle boom, owned by the first clerk of the La Sal Forest which had been created to provide sensible management of the region's fragile ecology, and home to a succession of humble prospectors who brought about Moab's Uranium boom, the Moab cabin is an important focus for regional history."

It has also been known as Balsley Cabin.
