= Apache Motel (Utah) =

- U.S. National Register of Historic Places
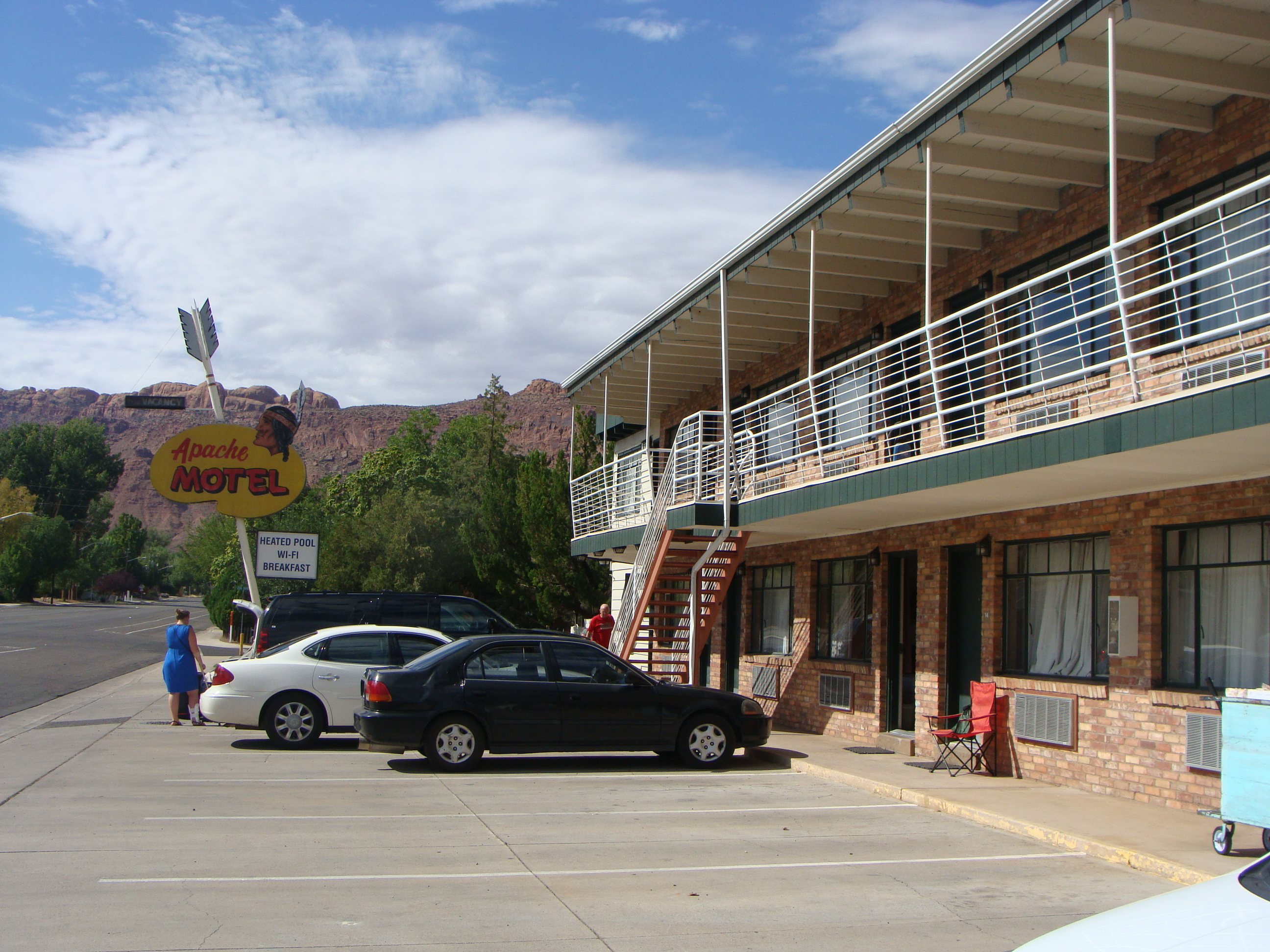
- Apache Motel, July 2012

- Location within Utah Location within the United States
- Location: 166 South 400 East; Moab, Utah 84532; United States
- Coordinates: 38°34′15″N 109°32′34″W
- Area: 1 acre (0.40 ha)
- Built: 1954
- Architectural style: Modern Movement
- Website: apachemotelinmoab.com
- NRHP reference No.: 08000062
- Added to NRHP: February 19, 2008

The Apache Motel is a historic motel in Moab, Utah, United States, that is listed on the National Register of Historic Places (NRHP).

== Description ==
The motel is located at 166 South 400 East and was built in 1954. The origin of the name, Apache Motel, is disputed. Despite the name, none of the Apache tribes ever occupied the region surrounding Moab. It has been occupied by Navajo, Ute, and Paiute groups. The name may have it origins with one of two movies filmed a few years earlier or from a uranium mining company.

The NRHP listing included Modern Movement style, in some or all of its two contributing buildings, one contributing structure, and one contributing object. The motel was constructed during an important era of dramatic change for Moab and was one of the first motels erected in the city. The first movie (Rio Grande) was filmed there in 1949 and uranium was discovered in the area in 1952.

The motel's website asserts that John Wayne stayed there "for months at a time". The family run motel was listed on the NRHP February 19, 2008.

== See also ==
- National Register of Historic Places listings in Grand County, Utah
