= Orlando W. Warner House =

- U.S. National Register of Historic Places
- Location within Utah Location within the United States
- Location: 1010 S. Mill Creek Dr., Moab, Utah
- Coordinates: 38.562383°N 109.532599°W
- Area: 5 acres (2.0 ha)
- Built: c.1890
- Built by: Orlando Warner
- NRHP reference No.: 77001304
- Added to NRHP: September 20, 1977

The Orlando W. Warner House, on S. Mill Creek Dr. in Moab, Utah, was built around 1890. It was listed on the National Register of Historic Places in 1977.

The two-story adobe house was built about ten years after its builder, O.W. Warner, arrived in Moab. Warner was born in Sepacuel, New York, in 1839.

"O. W. came to Utah with his family and settled in Fillmore in 1851. Capitalizing on the experience with his father and older brothers in operating sawmills in the Fillmore area, Orlando built first a sawmill and later a grist mill after he arrived in the Moab area. During the winter of 1881, he was awarded a contract to build a section of the Denver and Rio Grande Railroad grade through Grand County. After moving his family to Moab in 1881, they lived first in a dugout and then a log cabin until the present two-story adobe house was completed. The house and grounds Were used for celebrations, especially Independence Day and the 24th of July, the date celebrating the arrival of the first Mormon pioneers in the Salt Lake Valley in 1847. A platform was constructed on top of the apple cellar and was used during the summer for community dances. Mr. Warner was a leader in the development of Moab's fruit industry. When he brought his family to Moab in 1881 he brought many fruit trees which he not only planted himself but distributed to other Moab settlers. The Warner orchards produced apples, peaches, and pears." The fruit trees were later taken out in favor of using the land for pasturage.

A fruit warehouse, built c.1910 and located about 150 yards (140 m) north of the house, is a second contributing building on the property.
