= Xianren Bridge =

Natural arch in Guangxi, China

Coordinates: 24.687723°N 106.799984°E

Xianren Bridge (simplified Chinese: 仙人桥; traditional Chinese: 仙人橋; pinyin: Xiānrén Qiáo; lit. 'Fairy Bridge') is a natural arch created by flowing water that has the world's longest recorded span. Carved of limestone karst, the formation bridges Buliu River in the northern Guangxi Zhuang Autonomous Region, China. Because of its remote location, accessible only by a three-hour rafting trip, it was not discovered until 2009 and remains relatively obscure. An expedition in October 2010 by the Natural Arch and Bridge Society first measured the bridge's span and found it to be 121.9 ± 4.6 m (400 ± 15 ft) in length.

== See also ==
- List of longest natural arches
