= Rock House–Custodian's Residence =

Historic house in Utah, United States

- Rock House--Custodian's Residence
- U.S. National Register of Historic Places
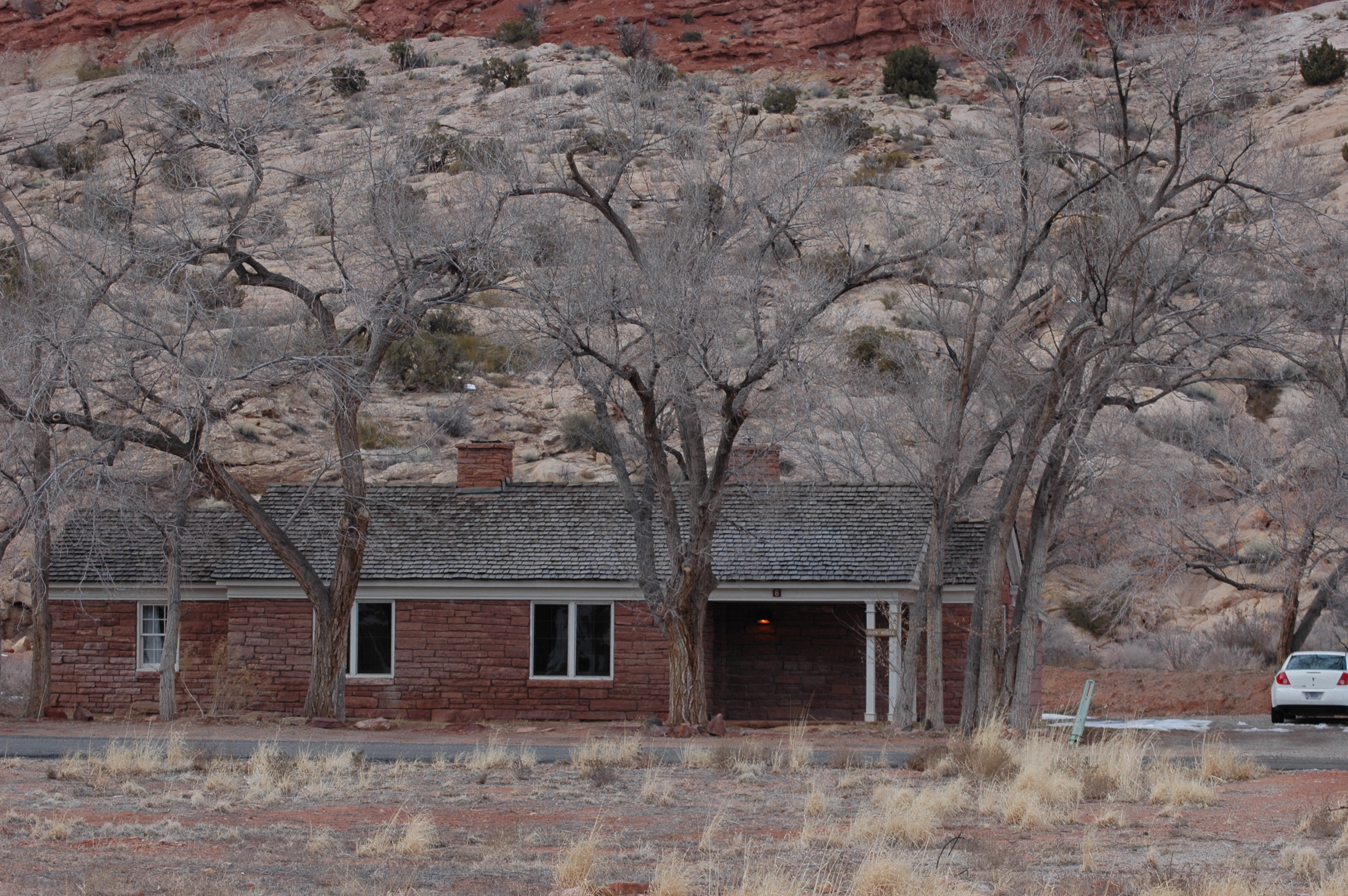

- Location within Utah Location within the United States
- Nearest city: Moab, Utah
- Coordinates: 38°37′4″N 109°36′55″W
- Area: 1 acre (0.40 ha)
- Built: 1937
- Architect: Norgard, Verland
- Architectural style: Late 19th And 20th Century Revivals, Greco-Federalist Revival
- MPS: Arches National Park MRA
- NRHP reference No.: 88001186
- Added to NRHP: October 6, 1988

The Rock House was built as a residence for the National Park Service custodian of Arches National Monument, now Arches National Park, in 1941. Constructed using Civilian Conservation Corps labor, the residence served its purpose until it was replaced by newer housing under the Park Service's Mission 66 program. The house is built of local stone in a coursed rubble pattern, with painted milled wood trim. The house was designed by Verland Norgard, in a style that combines rustic elements with Greek Revival and Federal style details. Two small, non-contributing additions have been constructed to the rear of the house, and the interior, which has been extensively modified, does not retain its historic integrity.

The Rock House was placed on the National Register of Historic Places on October 6, 1988. It has been used as office space for the Canyonlands Natural History Association.
