= Wolfe Ranch =

- Wolfe Ranch Historical District
- U.S. National Register of Historic Places
- U.S. Historic district
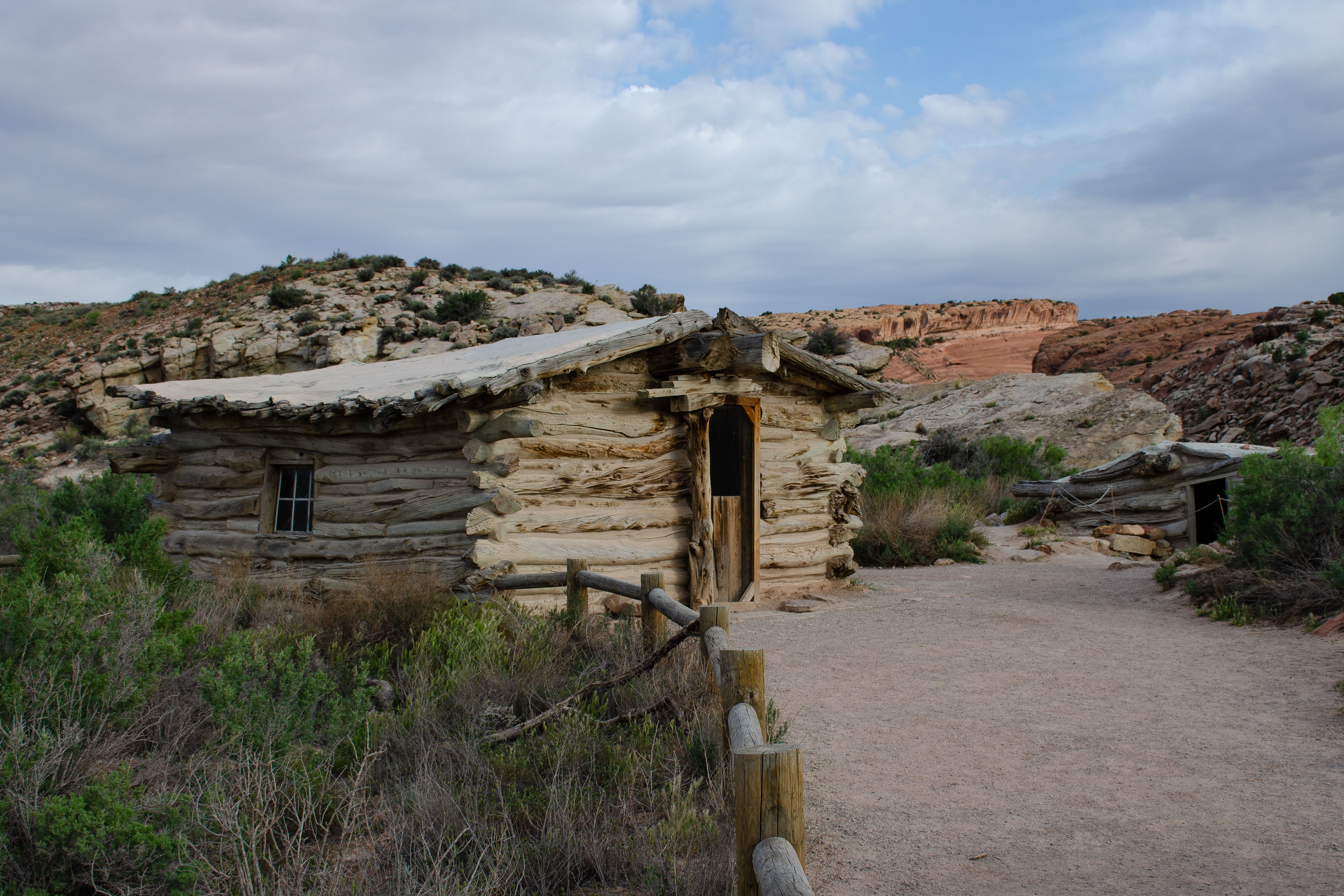
- the Wolfe Ranch Cabin

- Location within Utah Location within the United States
- Location: Arches National Park, Grand County, Utah; United States
- Nearest city: Moab, Utah
- Coordinates: 38.736422°N 109.519721°W
- Built: 1898
- NRHP reference No.: 75000167
- Added to NRHP: November 20, 1975

The Wolfe Ranch, also known as Turnbow Cabin, is located in Arches National Park near Moab, Utah, United States.

John Wesley Wolfe settled in the location in 1898 with his oldest son Fred. A nagging leg injury from the Civil War prompted Wolfe to move west from Ohio, looking for a drier climate. He chose this tract of more than 100 acres (0.40 km^{2}) along Salt Wash for its water and grassland - enough for a few cattle. The Wolfes built a one-room cabin, a corral, and a small dam across Salt Wash. For more than a decade they lived alone on the remote ranch. In 1906, John Wolfe's daughter Flora Stanley, her husband, and their children moved to the ranch. Shocked at the primitive conditions, Stanley convinced her father to build a new cabin with a wood floor.

The ranch on Salt Wash was established about that time under the Bar DX brand. With the arrival of Wolfe's daughter and son-in-law in 1906, the newer, surviving structures were built. However, the Stanley family moved to Moab in 1908. The family sold the ranch to Tommy Larson in 1910 and returned to Ohio. John Wolfe died on October 22, 1913, in Etna, Ohio at the age of eighty-four.

Larson eventually sold the ranch to Marvin Turnbow and his partners, Lester Walker and Stib Beeson. Turnbow helped with the first detailed geologic mapping of the area and partly because of this, early US Geological Survey maps show the name, "Turnbow Cabin." Wolfe's granddaughter, Ester Stanley Rison, visited the ranch in 1970 and provided information about the cabin's early history. As a result, the original name has been restored, and "Wolfe Ranch" appears on more recent maps.

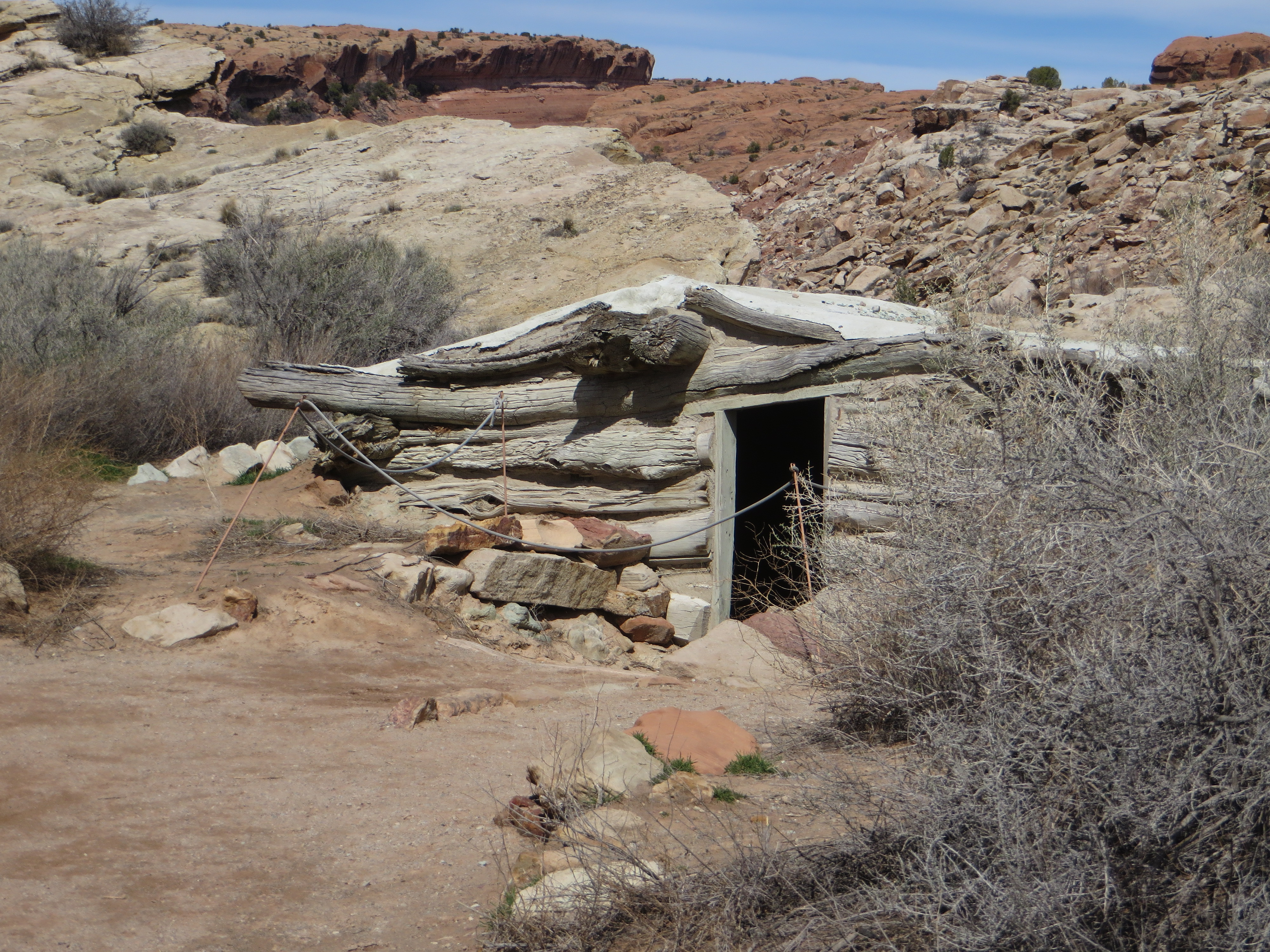
A 1907 root cellar is adjacent to the cabin

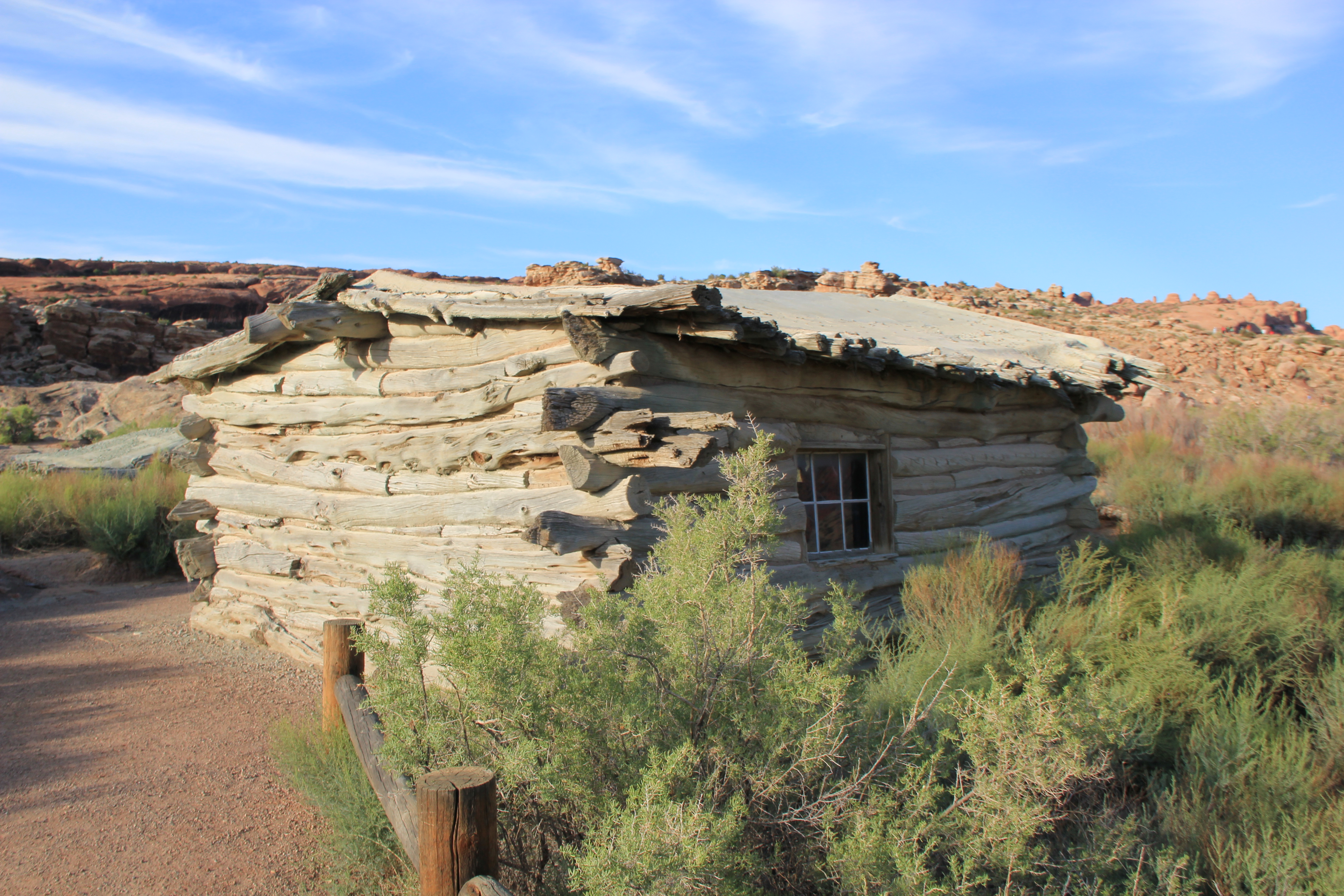
The rear of the cabin

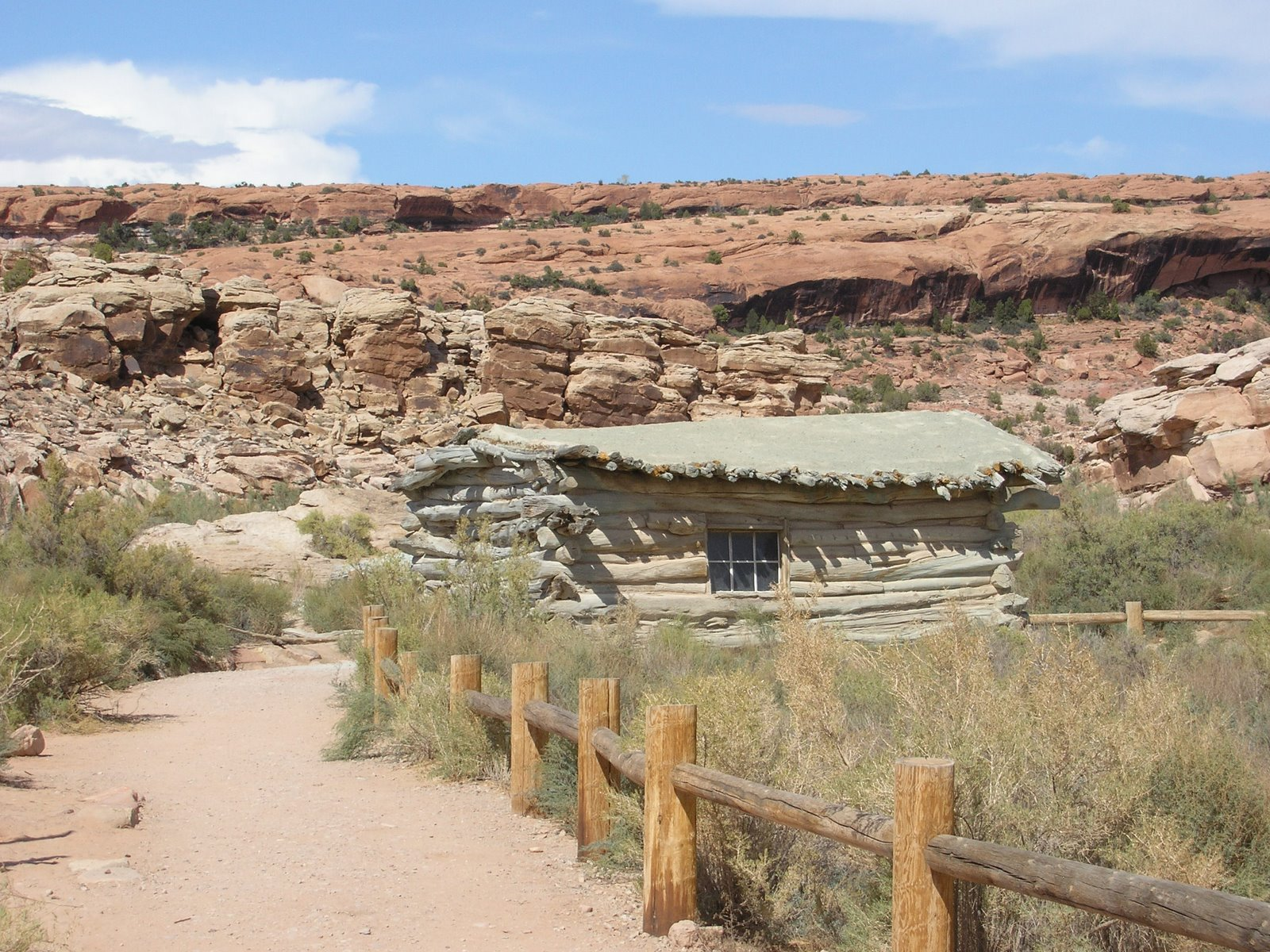
The cabin from a distance

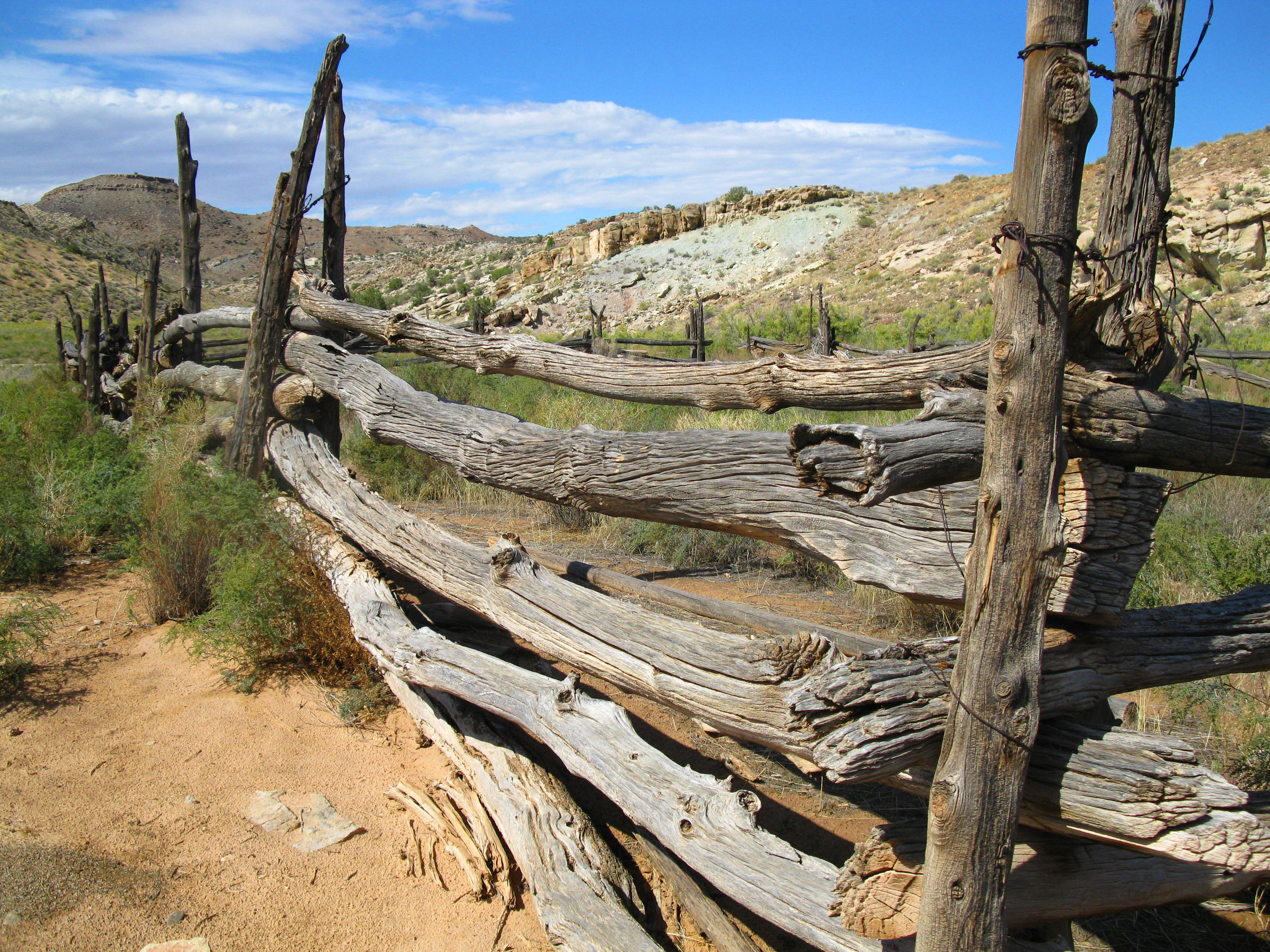
The rear portion of the wooden fence surrounding the cabin
