= Ringhoffer Inscription =

- U.S. National Register of Historic Places
- Location within Utah Location within the United States
- Nearest city: Moab, Utah
- Coordinates: 38°47′25″N 109°41′17″W
- Area: 1 acre (4,000 m^{2})
- Built: 1923
- Architect: Ringhoffer, Alex
- MPS: Arches National Park MRA
- NRHP reference No.: 88001185
- Added to NRHP: October 6, 1988

The Ringhoffer Inscription is located near Tower Arch in Arches National Park. The inscription commemorates the claimed discovery of Tower Arch by Alex Ringhoffer, who was one of the principal advocates for national park designation in the Arches region. The panel is located at the base of the arch, measuring 57 inches (140 cm) by 42 inches (110 cm) and reads:

Discovered BY MR. AND MRS. ALEX RINGHOFFER AND SONS 1922-3

The inscription is incised into the sandstone rock. The site includes Tower Arch and was placed on the National Register of Historic Places on October 6, 1988.
