= List of longest natural arches =

This list of longest natural arches ranks the world's natural arches by the length of their span as defined and measured by the Natural Arch and Bridge Society (NABS).

As a disclaimer, the NABS states that the information in this list, and therefore the rankings, may change due to more accurate measurements in the future, changes in span length due to natural forces, and the discovery of previously undocumented arches.

== Longest natural arches ==
All known natural arches with span lengths of 180 ft (54.9 m) or greater are included in the list. Sort by clicking on column headings, excepting only the Image and Notes columns.

Rank	Image	Name	Location	Span (m)	Span (ft)	Notes
1		Xianren Bridge (Fairy Bridge)	China, Guangxi, Buliu River	121.9	400	Span measured by Natural Arch and Bridge Society (NABS) in 2010. The accuracy is stated as within ±15 ft (4.57 m).
2		Zhijin Natural Bridge	China, Guizhou, Zhijin Cave Scenic Area	103.6	340	Span measured by NABS, 2015.
3		Jiangzhou Natural Bridge	China, Guangxi, Jiangzhou	94.5	310	Span measured by NABS, 2010. Estimates range from 280 ft (85.34 m) to 340 ft (103.6 m), so the midpoint is listed, ±36 ft (11.0 m) which includes a ±6 ft (1.8 m) accuracy above/below the higher/lower estimate. Jiangzhou ranks somewhere between 2nd and 6th position based on current estimates.
4	external image	Dachuandong Arch	China, Guizhou, Si Lian	91.4	300	Span measured by NABS, 2015.
5		Landscape Arch	United States, Utah, Arches National Park	88.4	290	Span measured by NABS, 2004.
6		Kolob Arch	United States, Utah, Zion National Park	87.5	287	Span measured by NABS, 2006. Formerly considered longer than Landscape Arch.
7	external image	Qingxudong Arch	China, Guizhou, Dafang	76.5	251	Span measured by NABS, 2015.
8		Aloba Arch	Chad, Ennedi-Ouest Region, Ennedi Plateau	76.2	250	Rank based on estimated span length only. Precise measurements have yet to be made according to NABS standards.
9		Morning Glory Natural Bridge	United States, Utah, Grandstaff Canyon	74.1	243	Span measured by NABS, year not specified. Morning Glory is a natural arch, not a natural bridge.
10	external image	Gaotun Natural Bridge	China, Guizhou, Gaotun	73.2	240	Span measured by NABS, 2010.
11		Rainbow Bridge	United States, Utah, Glen Canyon National Recreation Area	71.3	234	Span measured by NABS, 2007. Formerly considered the 3rd longest span in the world.
12	external image	Great Arch of Getu	China, Guizhou, Getu Valley National Park	70.1	230	Span measured by NABS, 2013 and 2015.
13		Sipapu Natural Bridge	United States, Utah, Natural Bridges National Monument	68.6	225	Span measured by NABS, 2007. Formerly considered the 4th longest span in the world.
14		Stevens Arch	United States, Utah, Canyons of the Escalante	67.1	220	Rank based on estimated span length only. Precise measurements have yet to be made according to NABS standards.
15		Shipton's Arch	China, Xinjiang, K'ashih	65.2	214	Discovered by Eric Shipton in 1947 and measured in 2000 by a National Geographic Society-sponsored expedition.
16	external image	Yunmentum Natural Bridge	China, Guizhou, Zunyi	64.9	213	Span measured by NABS, 2013.
17	external image	Hazarchishma Natural Bridge	Afghanistan, Bamyan Province, Jawzari Canyon	64.3	211	Discovered by the Wildlife Conservation Society in 2010. WCS returned to measure the span according to NABS standards in 2011.
18	external image	Outlaw Arch	United States, Colorado, Dinosaur National Monument	62.8	206	Discovered by rock climbers in 2006 who returned later in the same year to measure the span according to NABS standards.
19		Snake Bridge	United States, New Mexico, Sanostee	62.2	204	Span measured by NABS, 1988. Arch is on land of the Navajo Nation and is not publicly accessible.
20		Pont d'Arc	France, Ardèche département	59	194	Spans the river Ardèche near the town of Vallon-Pont-d'Arc.
21		Kachina Bridge	United States, Utah, Natural Bridges National Monument	58.2	192	Span measured by NABS, 2007. An earlier non-NABS estimate was 206 ft (62.8 m).
22		Tianmen Shan	China, Hunan Province, Zhangjiajie	55	180	130 m high. Span reported by NABS.
23		Wrather Arch	United States, Arizona, Wrather Canyon	54.9	180	NABS states that the span cannot be more than 180 ft (54.9 m) based on a related measurement made in 2008, though the span has not yet been measured precisely according to NABS standards. An earlier non-NABS estimate was 246 ft (75.0 m).

== See also ==
- List of individual rocks
