= Yellowstone Natural Bridge =

Natural arch in Wyoming, USA

Coordinates: 44°31′35″N 110°27′24″W

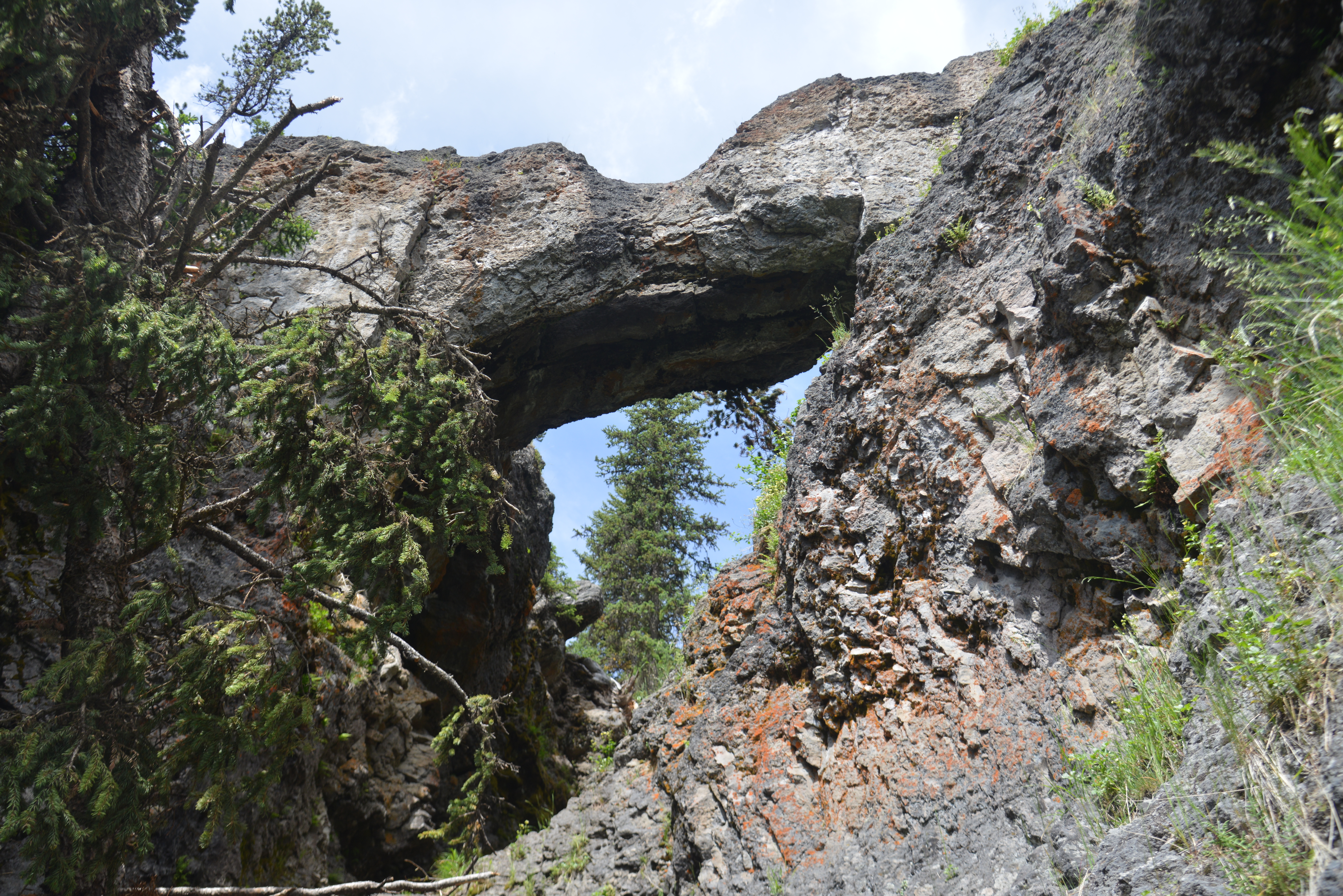
Yellowstone Natural Bridge

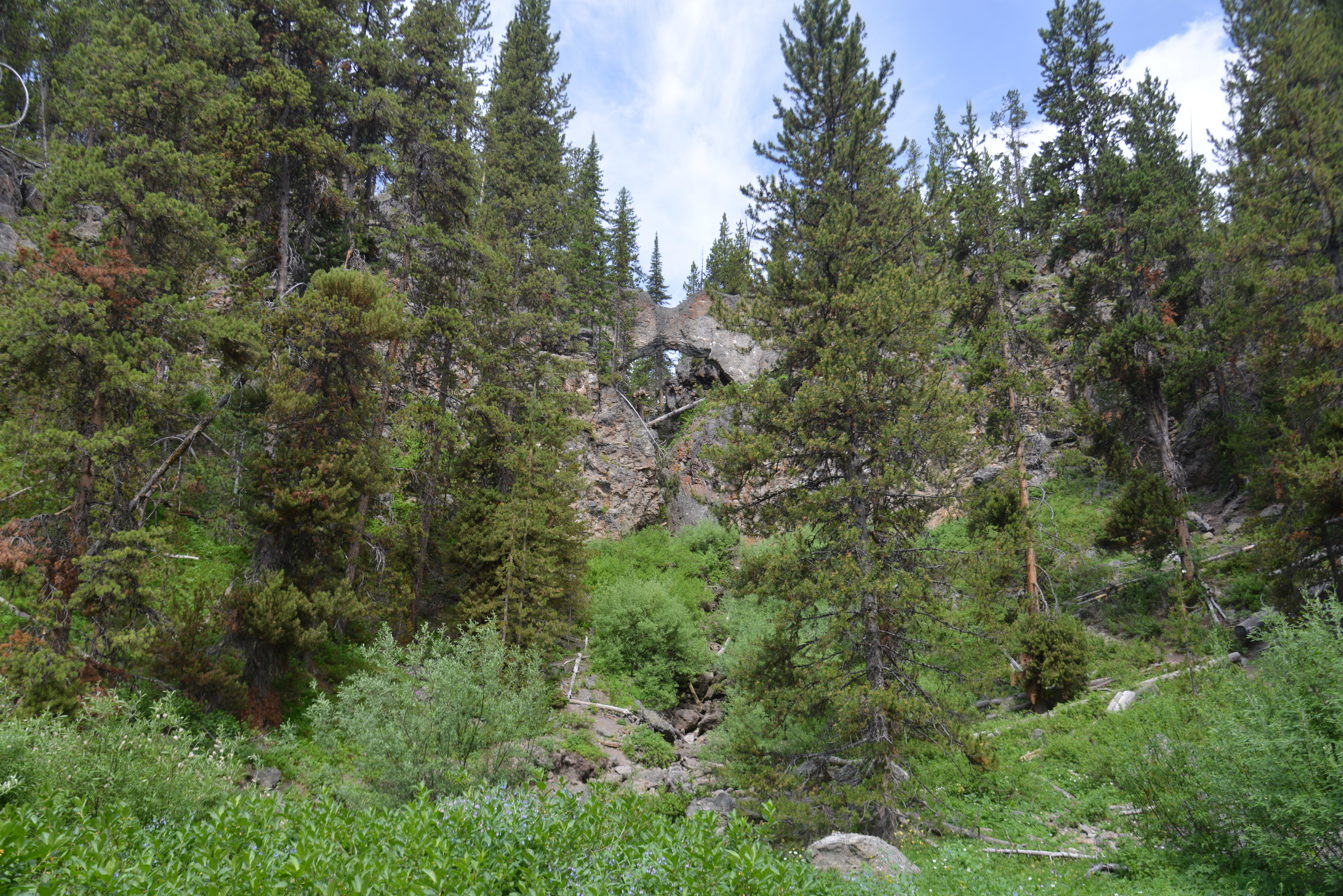
Yellowstone Natural Bridge area

Yellowstone Natural Bridge is a natural arch in Yellowstone National Park, Wyoming. The arch is at an elevation of 7,983 feet (2,433 m) and can be reached by hiking a little more than a mile (approximately 1.8 km) from the Bridge Bay marina parking lot. The arch is 51 feet (16 m) tall and was created as water eroded through the surrounding rhyolite rock.
