= Holei =

Holei may refer to:

- Ochrosia kilaueaensis, sometimes called holei
- Holei island, an island in the Palmyra Atoll
- Hōlei Sea Arch, a former geologic formation in Hawaiʻi
