= Aruba Natural Bridge =

Collapsed limestone arch in Aruba

- Natural arch
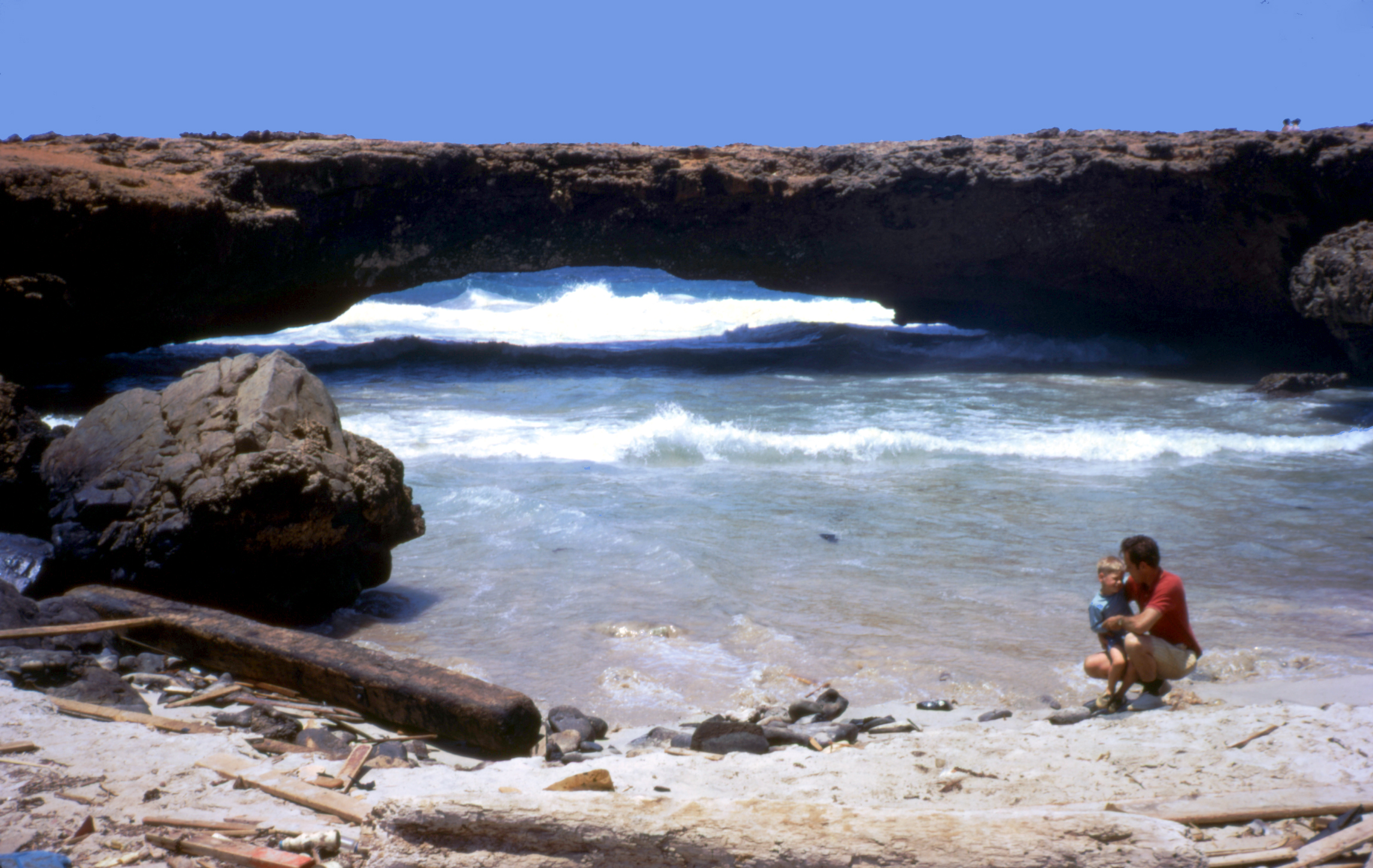
- Aruba Natural Bridge in 1973

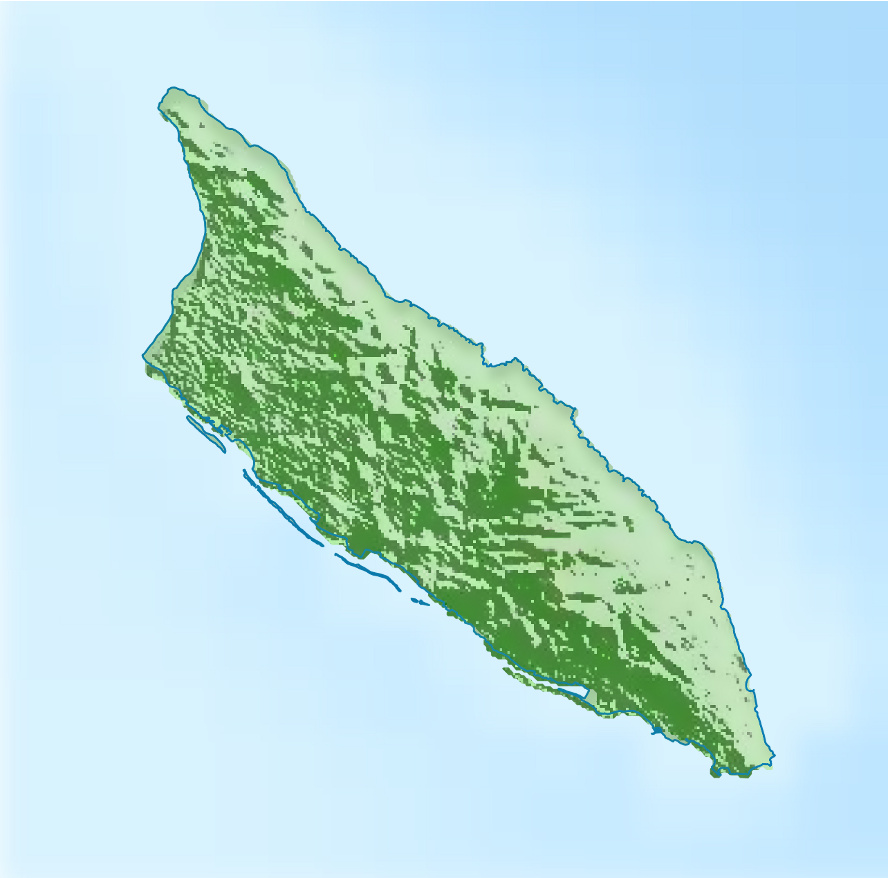
- Location within Aruba
- Coordinates: 12°32′28″N 69°57′30″W
- Location: Arikok National Park, Aruba

The Aruba Natural Bridge was a tourist attraction in Aruba that was formed naturally out of coral limestone. It collapsed on 2 September 2005. The natural arch, measuring approximately 25 feet (7.6 m) high and 100 feet (30 m) long, was the remnant of an ancient cave.

Aruban tourism minister Edison Briesen said that at the time the bridge was featured in nearly all promotional tourist fliers and that tourists visited it more than any other attraction at the time of collapse. Several years prior to the collapse, the bridge suffered a crack on one of its ends, according to one local.

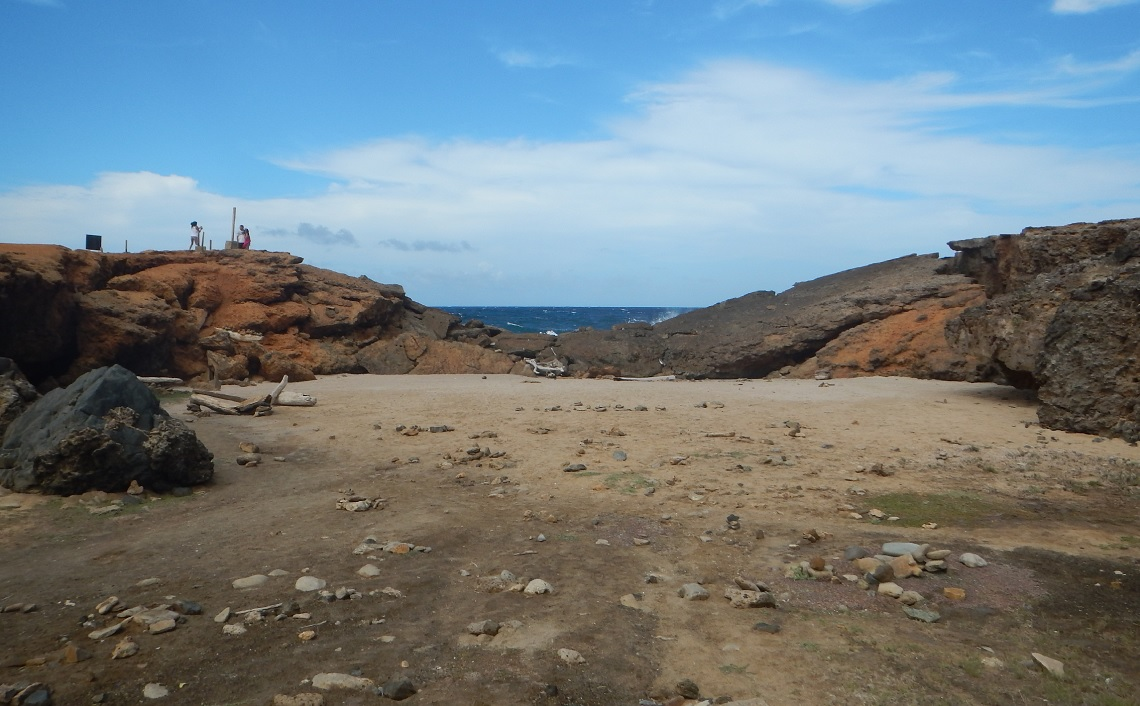
Aruba Natural Bridge ruins in 2013
