= Goedehoop natural rock bridge =

Natural sandstone formation on the Vaal River, South Africa

Goedehoop Natural Rock Bridge
- Natural arch
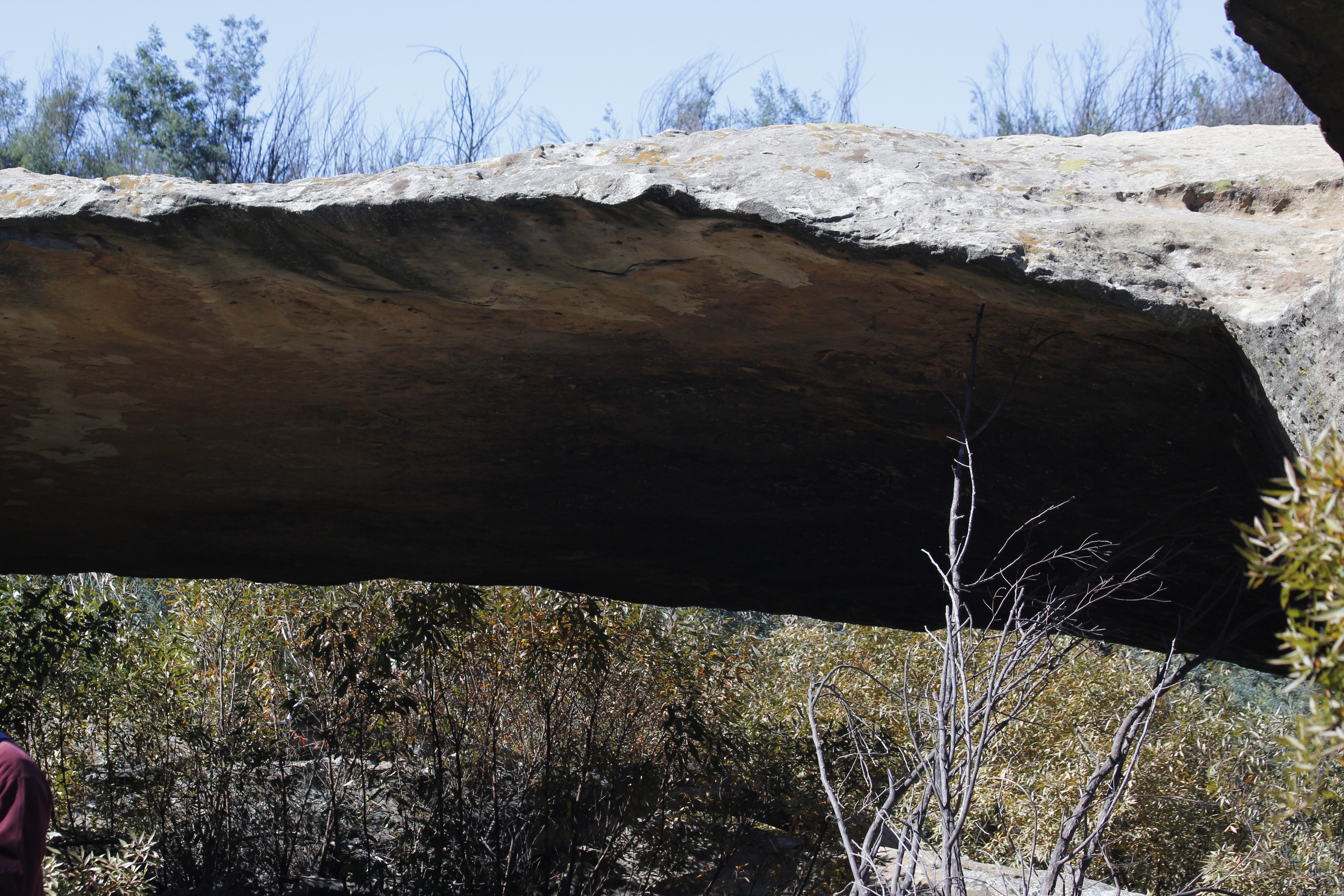

- Location within South Africa Location within Mpumalanga
- Coordinates: 26°24′18″S 30°09′35″E
- Location: Ermelo, South Africa

The Goedehoop natural rock bridge is a provincial heritage site in Ermelo in the Mpumalanga province of South Africa.

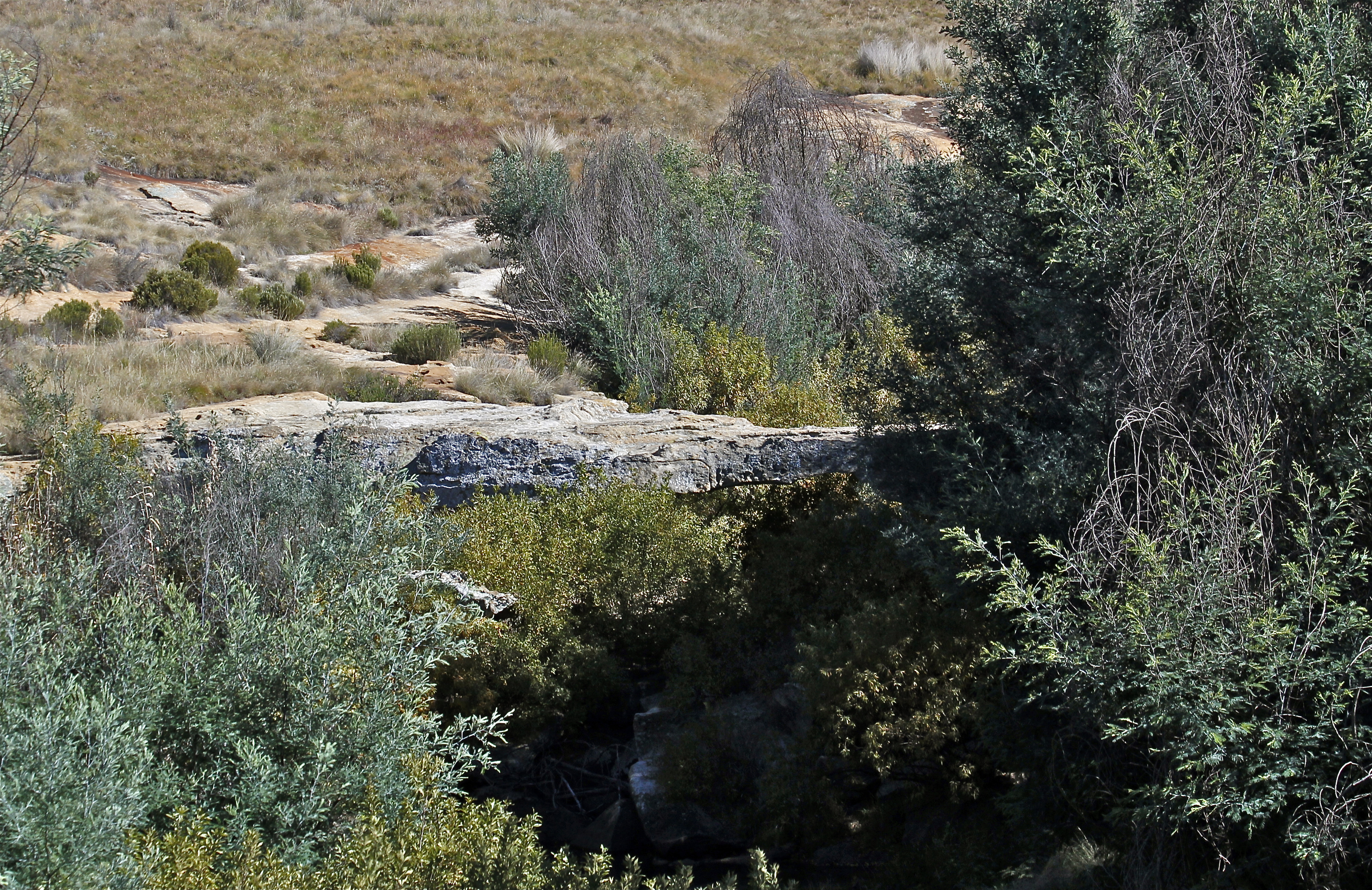

In 1982 it was described in the Government Gazette of South Africa:

This natural sandstone bridge over the Vaal River is approximately 22 metres long, five to eight metres wide and four metres high. Large natural rock bridges are rare landforms and this bridge, therefore, can justly be regarded as one of South Africa's geomorphologic gems.
