= Arturos Bridge =

Arch in California, US

Coordinates: 32°56′26″N 114°39′02″W

Arturos Bridge is a natural arch in the U.S. state of California. It is located in Imperial County. The arch is 12 feet long, 11 feet high, has a thickness of 4 feet, and has a width of 4 feet.
