= Balcony Bridge =

Coordinates: 41.7444°N 121.5458°W

Balcony Bridge is a natural arch in the U.S. state of California. It is located in Siskiyou County.
