= Natural arch =

Arch-shaped natural rock formation

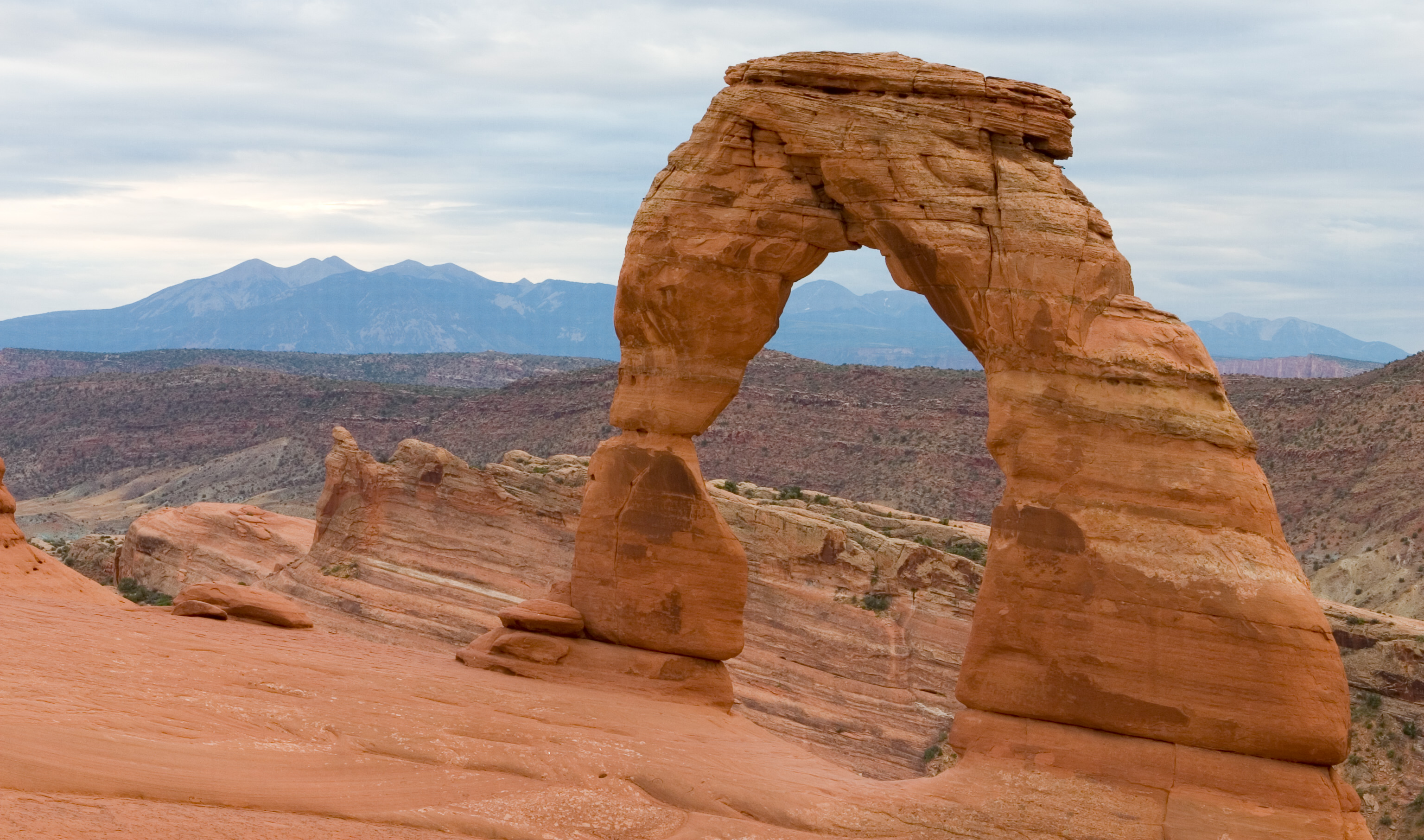
Delicate Arch in Arches National Park, Utah, United States

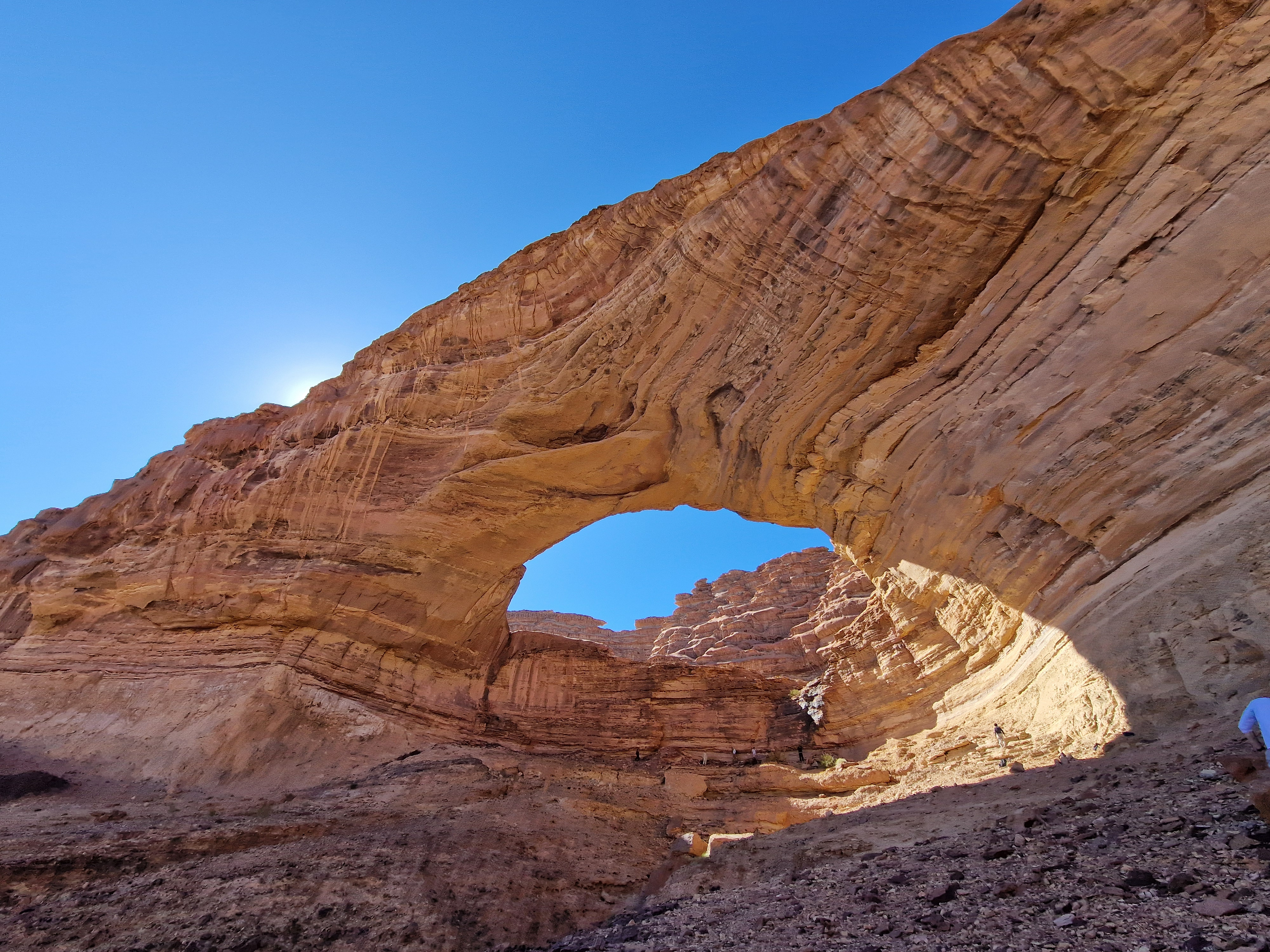
The Great Arch, Tabuk Province, Saudi Arabia

A natural arch, natural bridge, or (less commonly) rock arch is a natural landform where an arch has formed with an opening underneath. Natural arches commonly form where inland cliffs, coastal cliffs, fins or stacks are subject to erosion from the sea, rivers or weathering (subaerial processes).

Most natural arches are formed from narrow fins and sea stacks composed of sandstone or limestone with steep, often vertical, cliff faces. The formations become narrower due to erosion over geologic time scales. The softer rock stratum erodes away creating rock shelters, or alcoves, on opposite sides of the formation beneath the relatively harder stratum, or caprock, above it. The alcoves erode further into the formation eventually meeting underneath the harder caprock layer, thus creating an arch. The erosional processes exploit weaknesses in the softer rock layers making cracks larger and removing material more quickly than the caprock; however, the caprock itself continues to erode after an arch has formed, which will ultimately lead to collapse.

The choice between bridge and arch is somewhat arbitrary. The Natural Arch and Bridge Society identifies a bridge as a subtype of arch that is primarily water-formed. By contrast, the Dictionary of Geological Terms defines a natural bridge as a "natural arch that spans a valley of erosion."

The largest natural arch on Earth, by a significant margin, is the Xianren Bridge in southern China, with a span of 122 ± 5 meters (400 ± 15 ft).

== Coastline ==
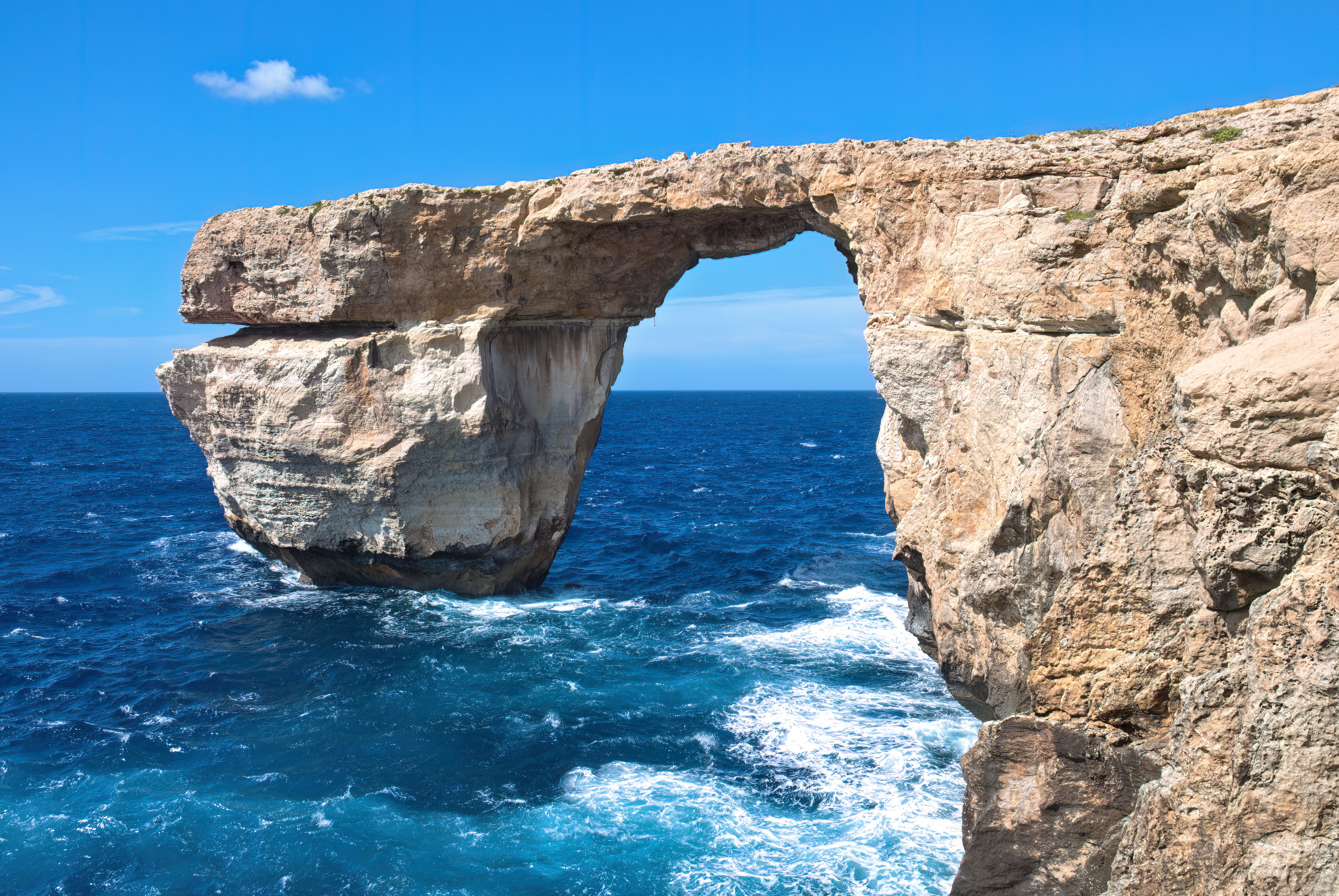
The Azure Window, Malta, before it collapsed in 2017

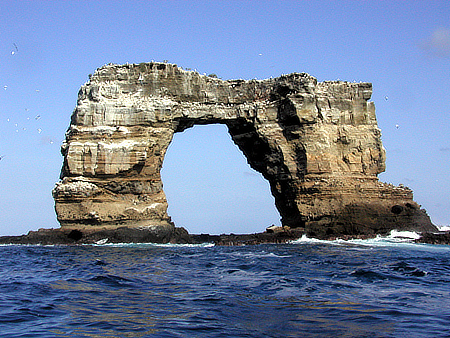
Darwin's Arch, Galápagos Islands, Ecuador, before it collapsed in 2021

On coasts two different types of arches can form depending on the geology. On discordant coastlines rock types run at 90° to the coast. Wave refraction concentrates the wave energy on the headland, and an arch forms when caves break through the headland. Two examples of this type of arch are London Bridge in Victoria, Australia, and Neill Island in the Andaman Islands, India. When these arches eventually collapse, they form stacks and stumps. On concordant coastlines rock types run parallel to the coastline, with weak rock such as shale protected by stronger rock such as limestone. The wave action along concordant coastlines breaks through the strong rock and then erodes the weak rock very quickly. Good examples of this type of arch are the Durdle Door and Stair Hole near Lulworth Cove on Dorset's Jurassic Coast in south England. When Stair Hole eventually collapses it will form a cove.

== Weather-eroded arches ==
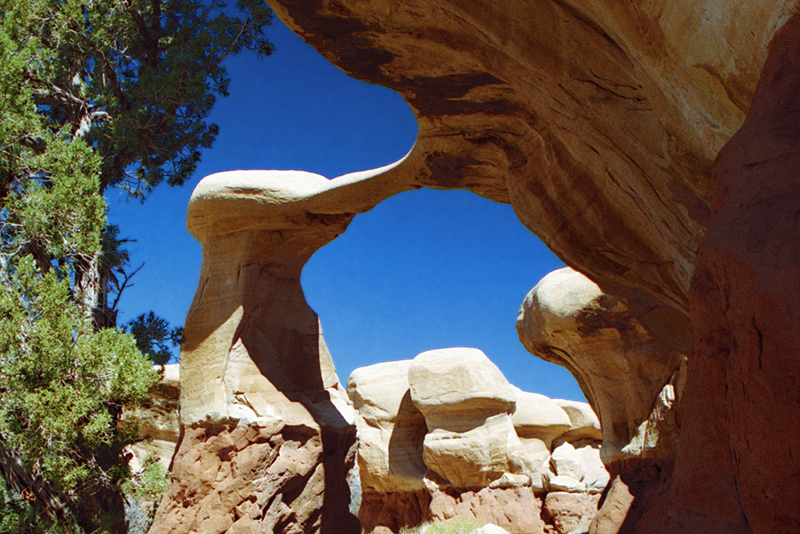
Metate Arch, Devils Garden (GSENM), a very thin arch near the end of its life

Weather-eroded arches begin their formation as deep cracks which penetrate into a sandstone layer. Erosion occurring within the cracks wears away exposed rock layers and enlarges the surface cracks, isolating narrow sandstone walls which are called fins. Alternating frosts and thawing cause crumbling and flaking of the porous sandstone and eventually cut through some of the fins. The resulting holes become enlarged to arch proportions by rockfalls and weathering. The arches eventually collapse leaving only buttresses that in time will erode.

Many weather-eroded arches are found in Arches National Park, Canyonlands National Park, and Grand Staircase–Escalante National Monument (GSENM), all located in southern Utah, United States.

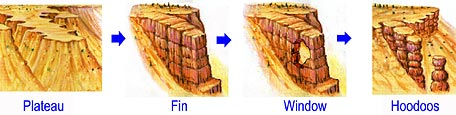
Progressive erosion producing plateau, fin, window (or arch), and hoodoos

== Water-eroded arches ==
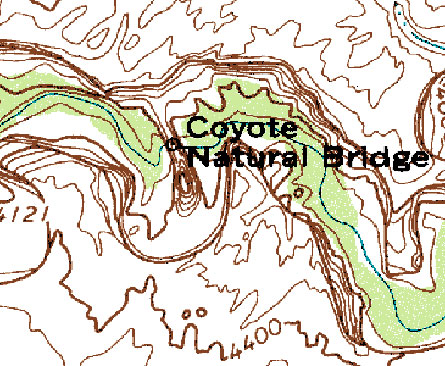
A topographic map of Coyote Natural Bridge in Utah shows how the meandering Coyote Gulch carved a shorter route through the rock under the arch. The old riverbed is now higher than the present water level.

Some natural bridges may look like arches, but they form in the path of streams that wear away and penetrate the rock. Pothole arches form by chemical weathering as water collects in natural depressions and eventually cuts through to the layer below.

Natural Bridges National Monument in Utah protects the area surrounding three large natural bridges, all of which were formed by streams running through canyons, the largest of which is named Sipapu Bridge with a span of 225 feet (69 m). The Rainbow Bridge National Monument's namesake was also formed by flowing water which created the largest known natural bridge in the Western Hemisphere with a span of 234 feet (71 m), based on a laser measurement made in 2007. Xianren Bridge, also known as Fairy Bridge, in Guangxi, China is currently the world's largest known natural bridge with a span recorded at 400 feet (120 m) by the Natural Arch and Bridge Society in October 2010, with a precision of ±15 feet (4.6 m).

== Cave erosion ==
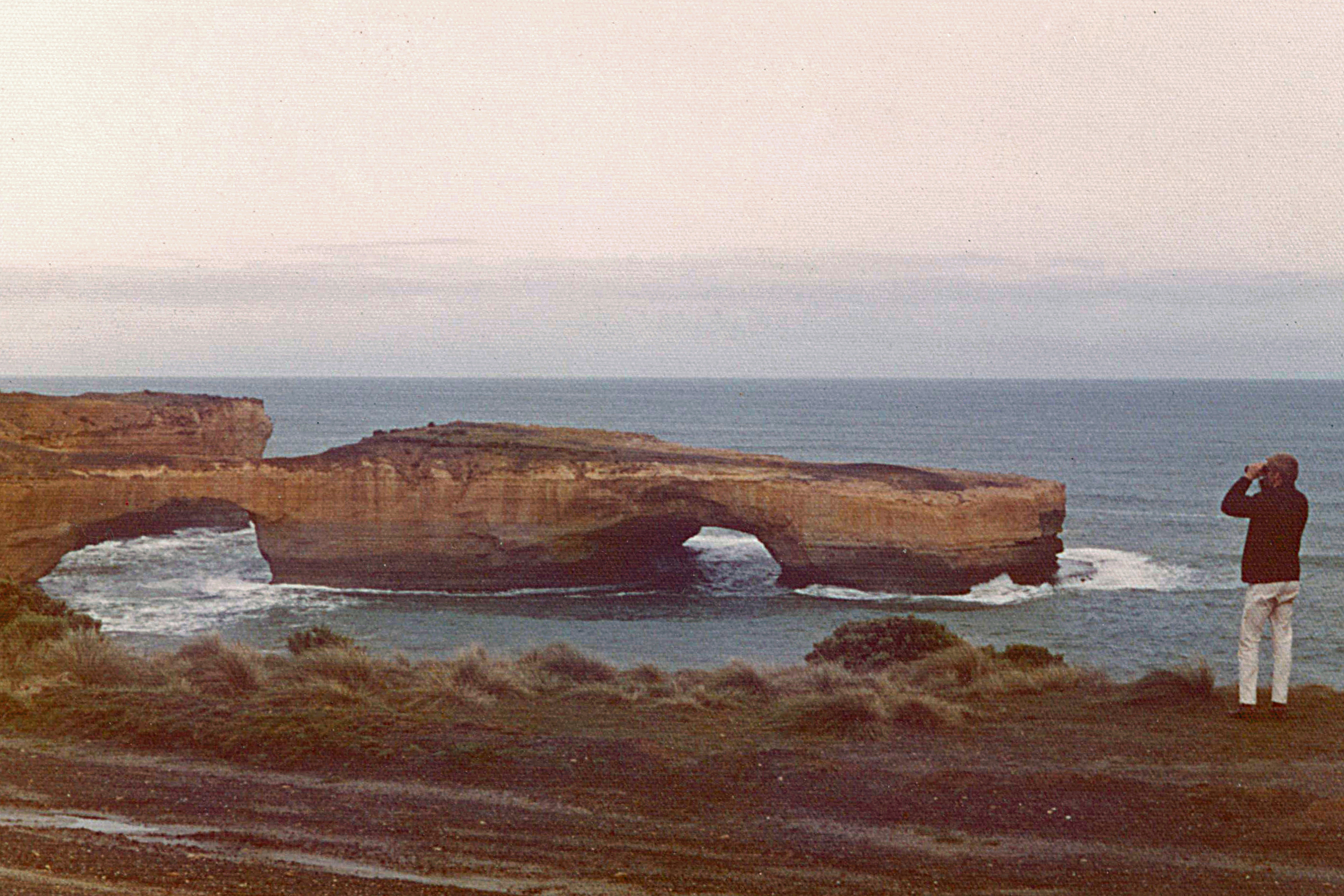
London Bridge, Victoria, Australia, before its partial collapse in 1990

Natural bridges can form from natural limestone caves, where paired sinkholes collapse and a ridge of stone is left standing in between, with the cave passageway connecting from sinkhole to sinkhole.

Like all rock formations, natural bridges are subject to continued erosion, and will eventually collapse and disappear. One example of this was the double-arched Victorian coastal rock formation, London Bridge, which lost an arch after storms increased erosion.

Moon Hill in Yangshuo, Guizhou Province, China, is an example of an arch formed by the remnant of a karst limestone cave.

== Arches as highway or railway bridges ==
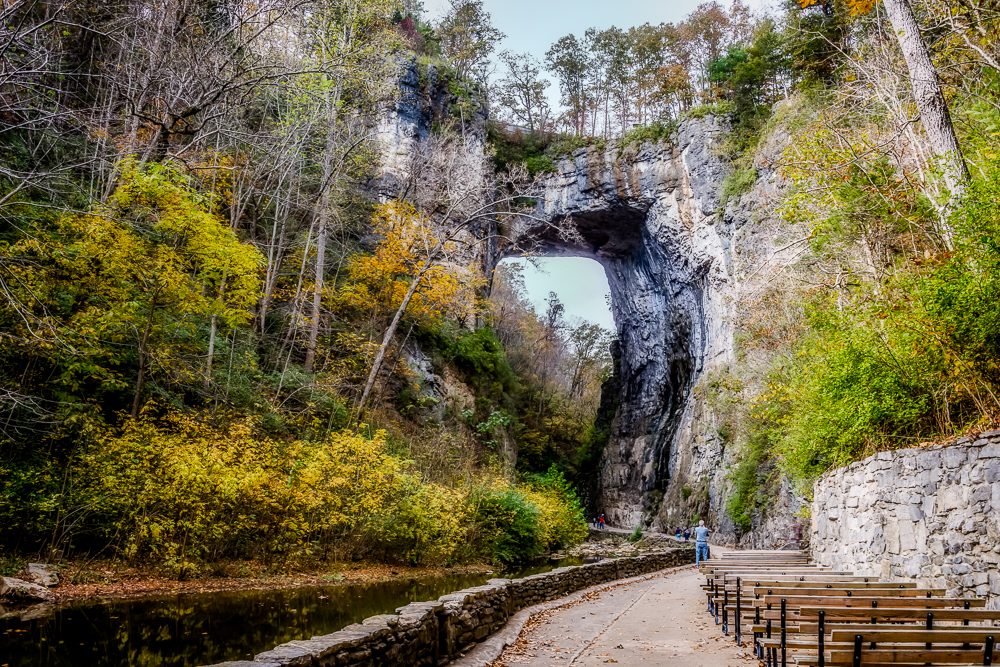
Natural Bridge, Virginia

In a few places in the world, natural arches are utilized by humans as transportation bridges with highways or railroads running across them.

In Virginia, US Route 11 traverses Natural Bridge. Two additional natural arch roadways are found in Kentucky. The first, a cave erosion arch made of limestone, is in Carter Caves State Resort Park and has a paved road on top. The second, a weather-eroded sandstone arch with a dirt road on top, is on the edge of Natural Bridge State Park in Kentucky. The latter arch is called White's Branch Arch (also known as the Narrows) and the road going over it is usually referred to as the Narrows Road.

In Europe, the Romanian village of Ponoarele has a road segment called God's Bridge that is 30 m (98 ft) long and 13 m (43 ft) wide, passing over a stone arch 22 m (72 ft) high and 9 m (30 ft) thick.

The railroad from Lima, Peru crosses the Rio Yauli on a natural bridge near kilometer 214.2 as it approaches the city of La Oroya.

== Notable natural arches ==
=== Africa ===
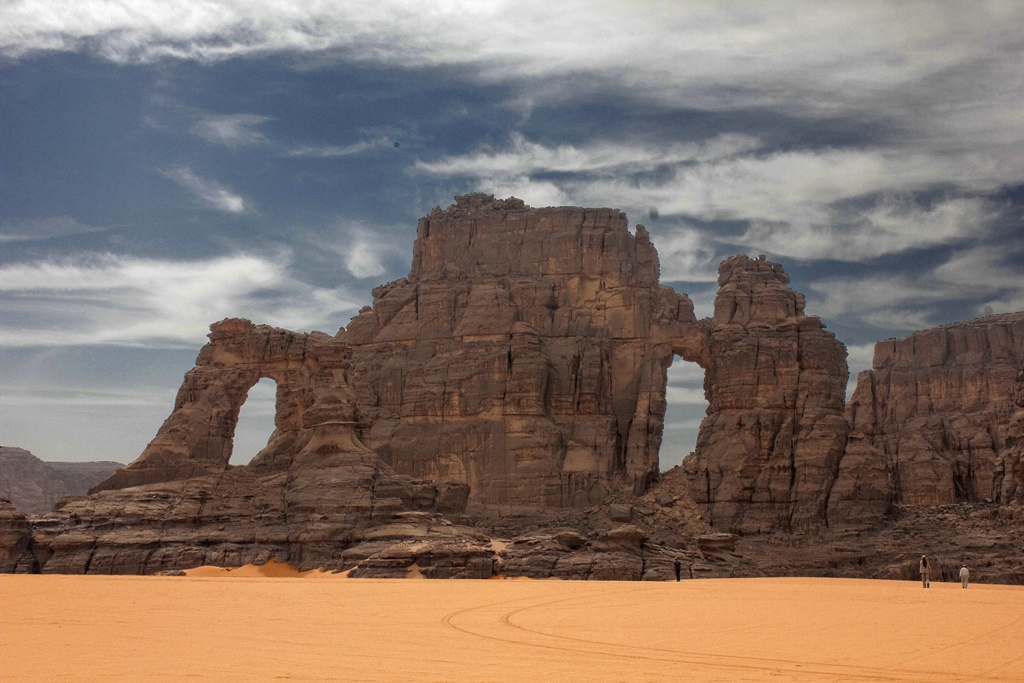
Natural arches in the La Cathedrale formation of Tadrart Rouge range, Algeria

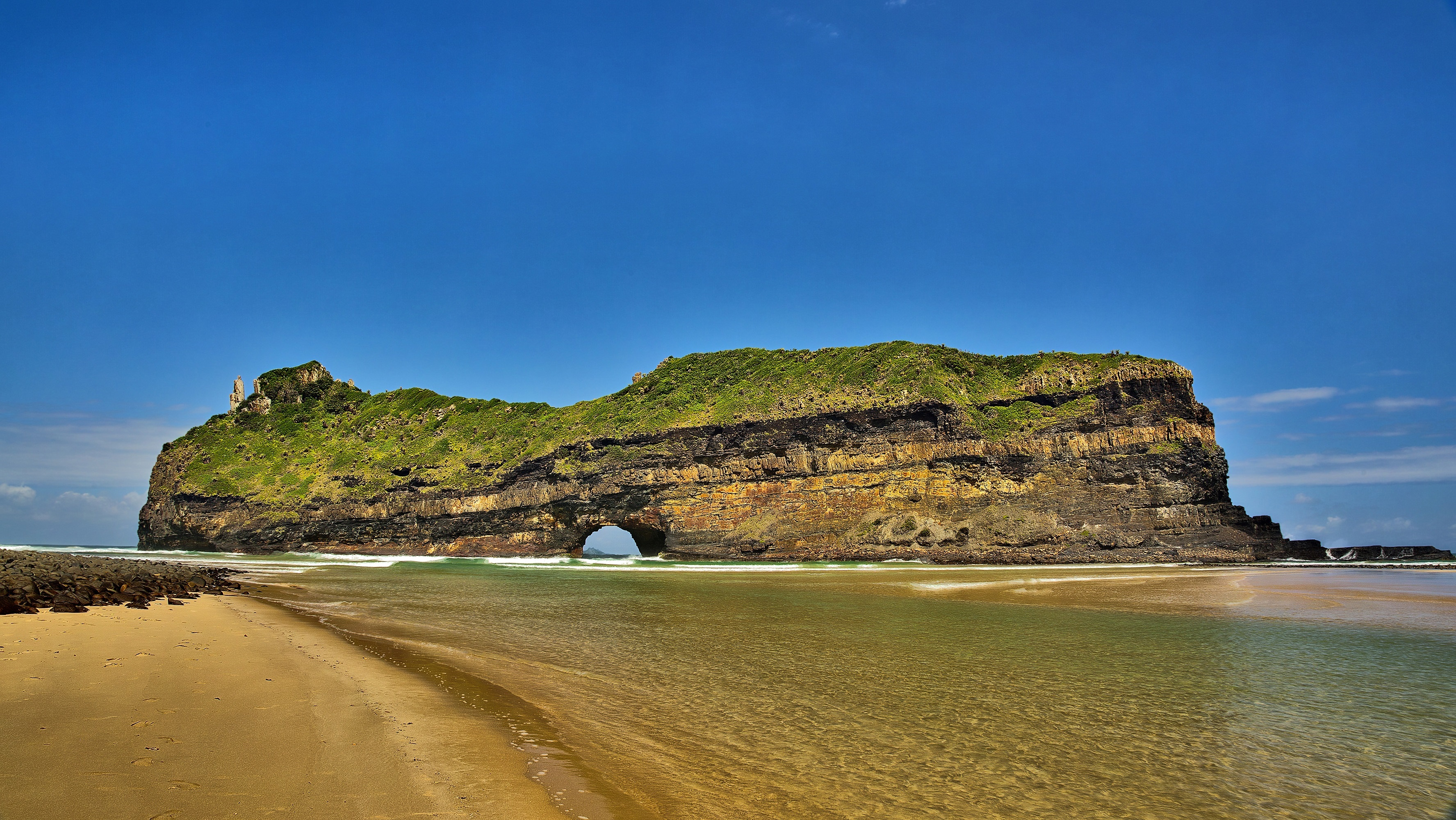
Hole-in-the-Wall

- Aloba Arch, Chad
- Acacus Tedrart Arch, Libya
- Boatswain Bird Island, Ascension Island
- Bogenfels, Namibia
- Goedehoop natural rock bridge, South Africa
- Hole-in-the-Wall, Eastern Cape, South Africa
- Tassili n'Ajjer and Tadrart Rouge, two mountain ranges with many arches, Algeria
- Tukuyu natural bridge, Tanzania
- Wolfberg Arch, Cederberg, Western Cape, South Africa

=== Antarctica ===
- The Kerguelen Arch, Christmas Harbour, the Kerguelen Islands (collapsed ca. 1910)
- Scott Island in the Antarctic has a natural arch

=== Asia ===
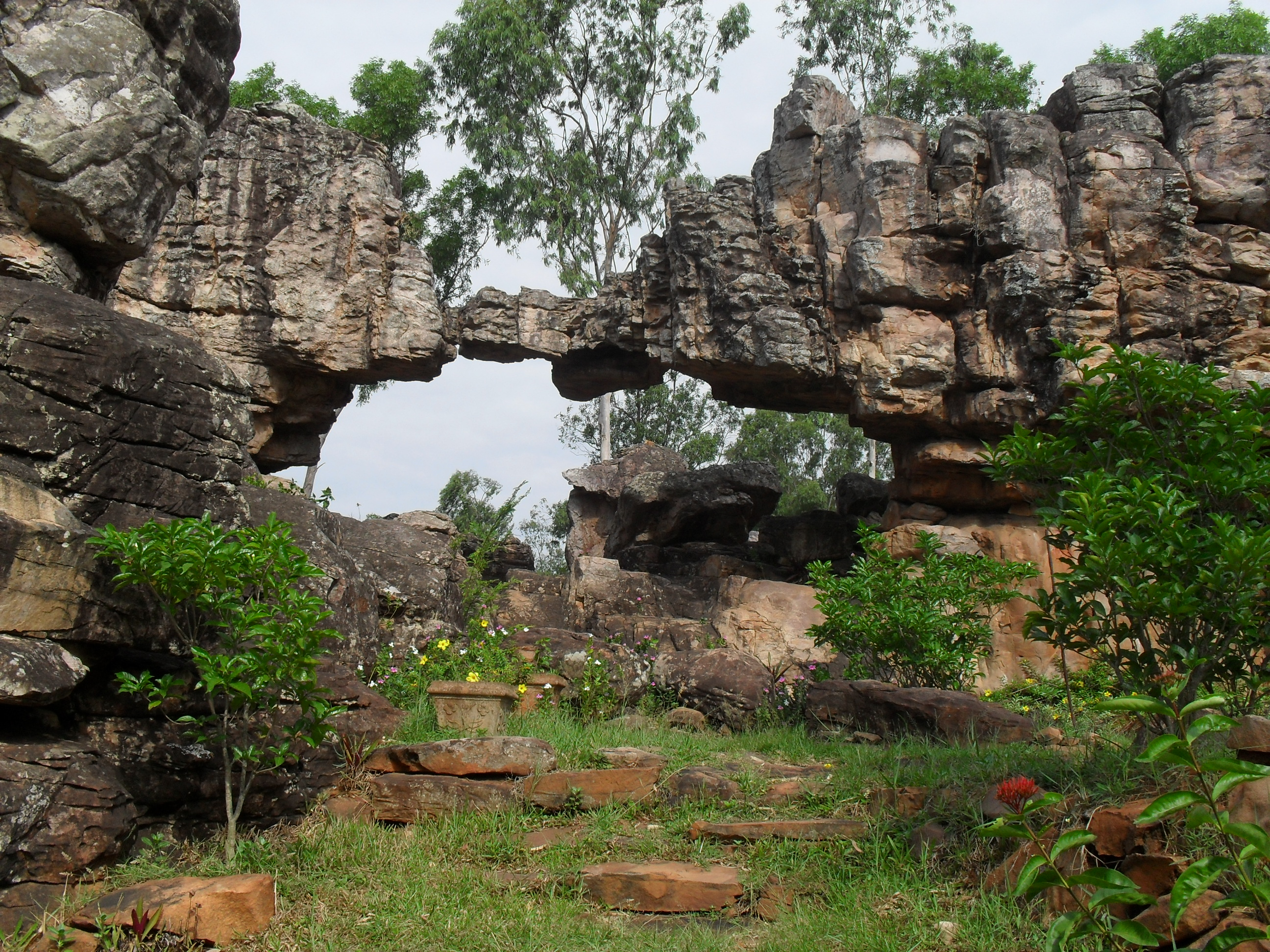
Natural Arch, Tirumala, India

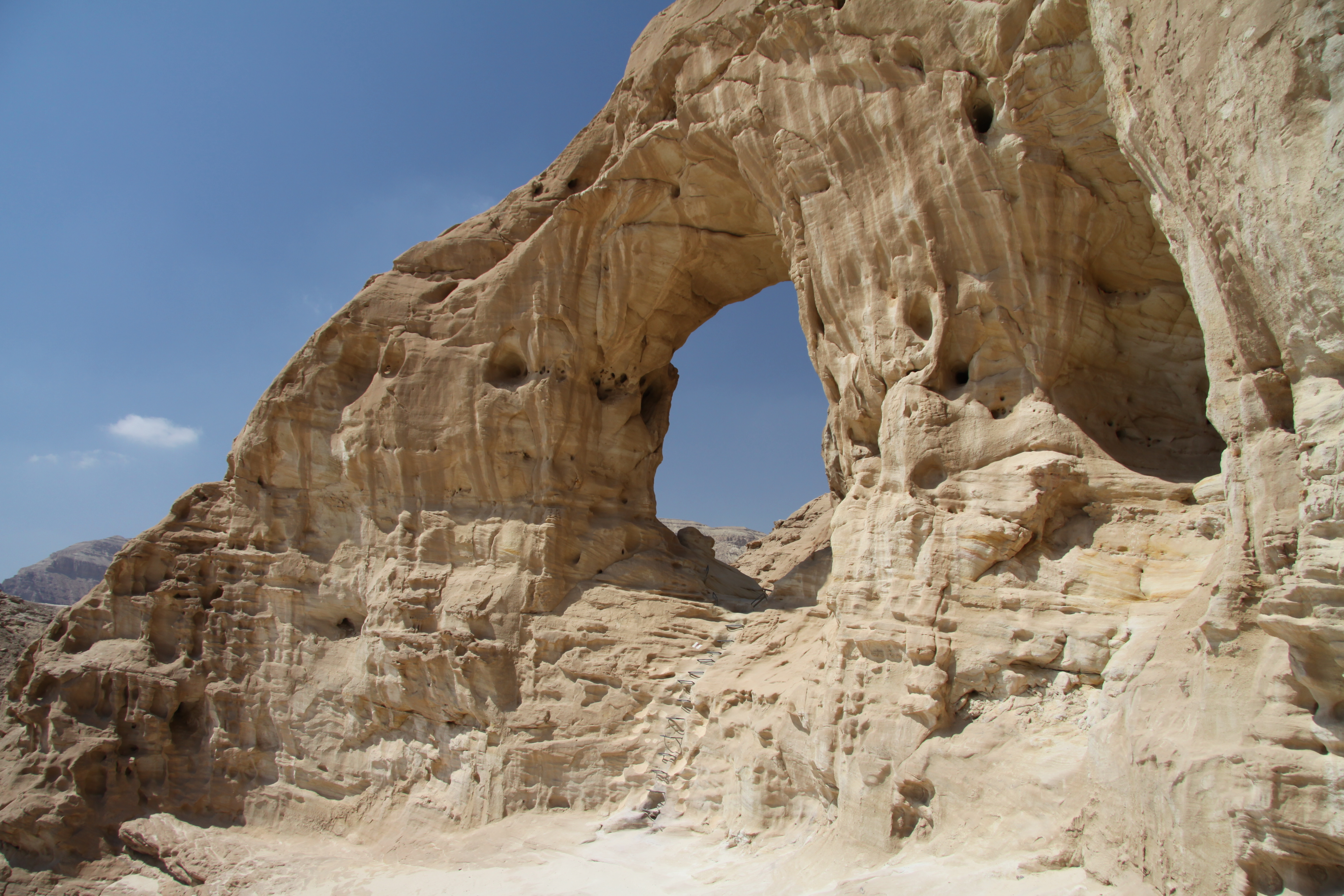
Arch in Timna Valley Park, Negev Desert, Israel

- Keshet Cave, Galilee, Israel
- Burdah Bridge, Wadi Rum, Jordan
- Baatara gorge waterfall in Tannourine, Lebanon has three natural bridges.
- Engetsu Island, Shirahama, Wakayama, Japan
- Hawrah Natural Bridge, Neill Island, Andaman Islands, India
- Hazarchishma Natural Bridge, Bamyan Province, Afghanistan
- Jabal Umm Fruth Bridge, Jordan
- Jebel Kharaz, Wadi Rum, Jordan
- "Jisr al-Hajar" or the "Stone Bridge" in Mzaar Kfardebian, Lebanon
- Elephant Trunk Hill, Guilin, Guangxi province, China
- Moon Hill, Guangxi province, China
- Natural Arch, Tirumala hills, Tirumala, India
- Pasilagon Point Natural Arch, Banton, Romblon, Philippines
- The Pigeons' Rock known as Raouché in Beirut, Lebanon
- Punarjani Guha, natural tunnel in Thrissur district of Kerala, India
- Rock Bridge of Gulanchwadi, Narayangaon, Maharashtra, India
- Shipton's Arch, Xinjiang, China
- Steller's Arch on Bering Island, Russia
- Tianmen Mountain, Zhangjiajie, China
- Xianren Bridge, China
- The Great White Hole of Krabi, Krabi, Thailand
- Mountain Angel Eye, Cao Bằng, Vietnam
- The Great Arch, Hizma, Tabuk Province, Kingdom of Saudi Arabia

=== Europe ===
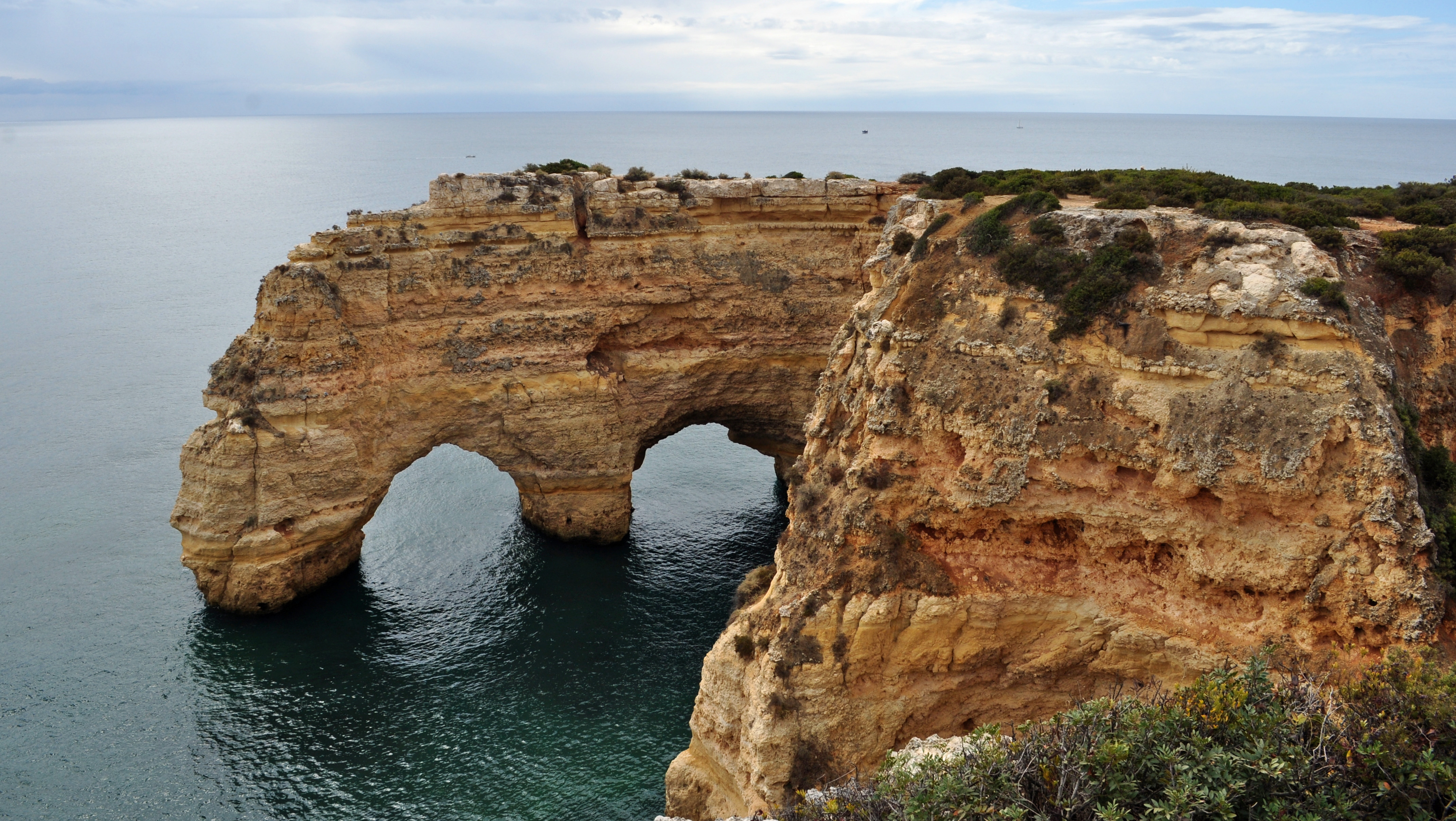
The arches at Marinha Beach, Caramujeira, Lagoa, Algarve, Portugal

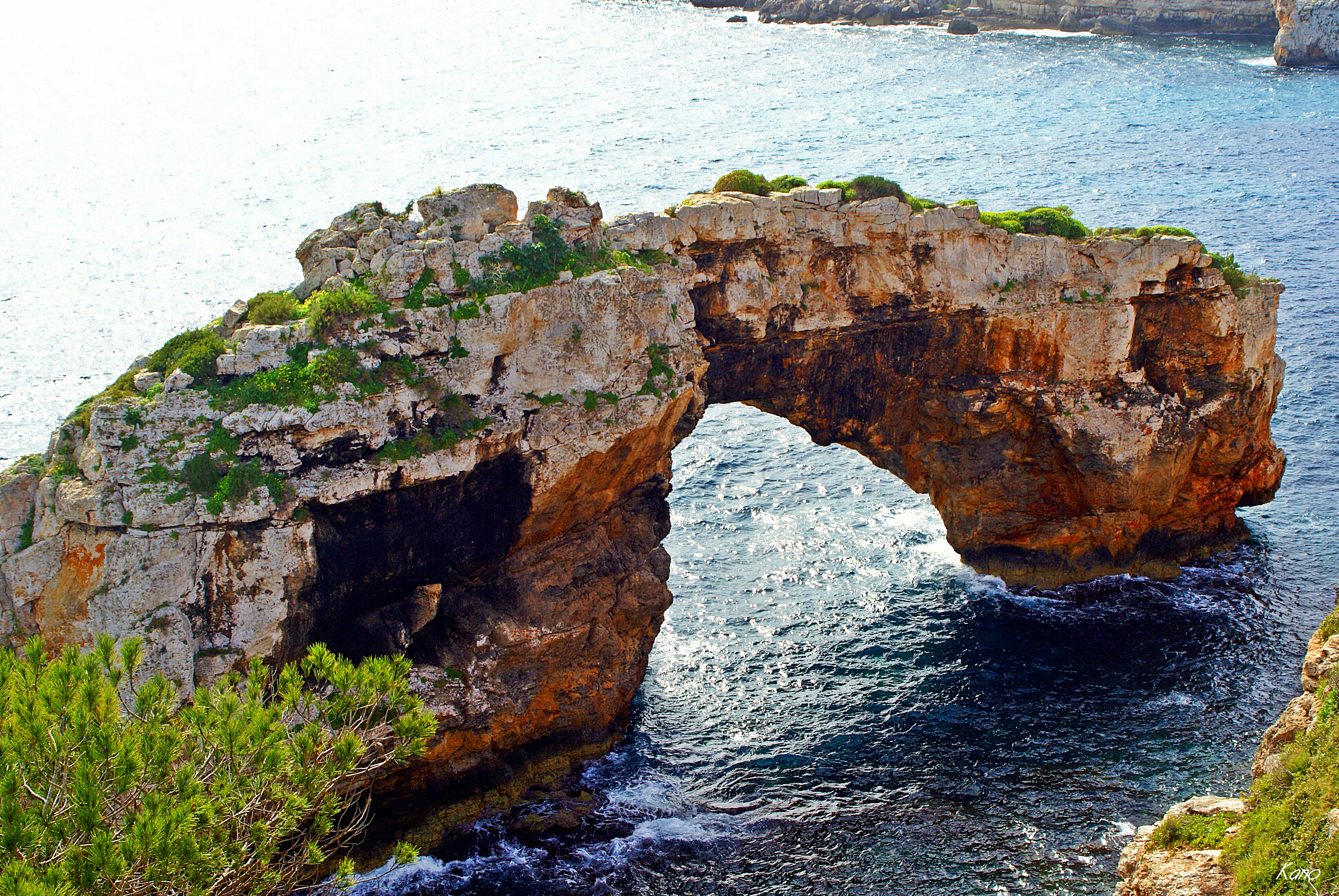
Es Pontàs is a natural arch on the coast of Mallorca, Spain

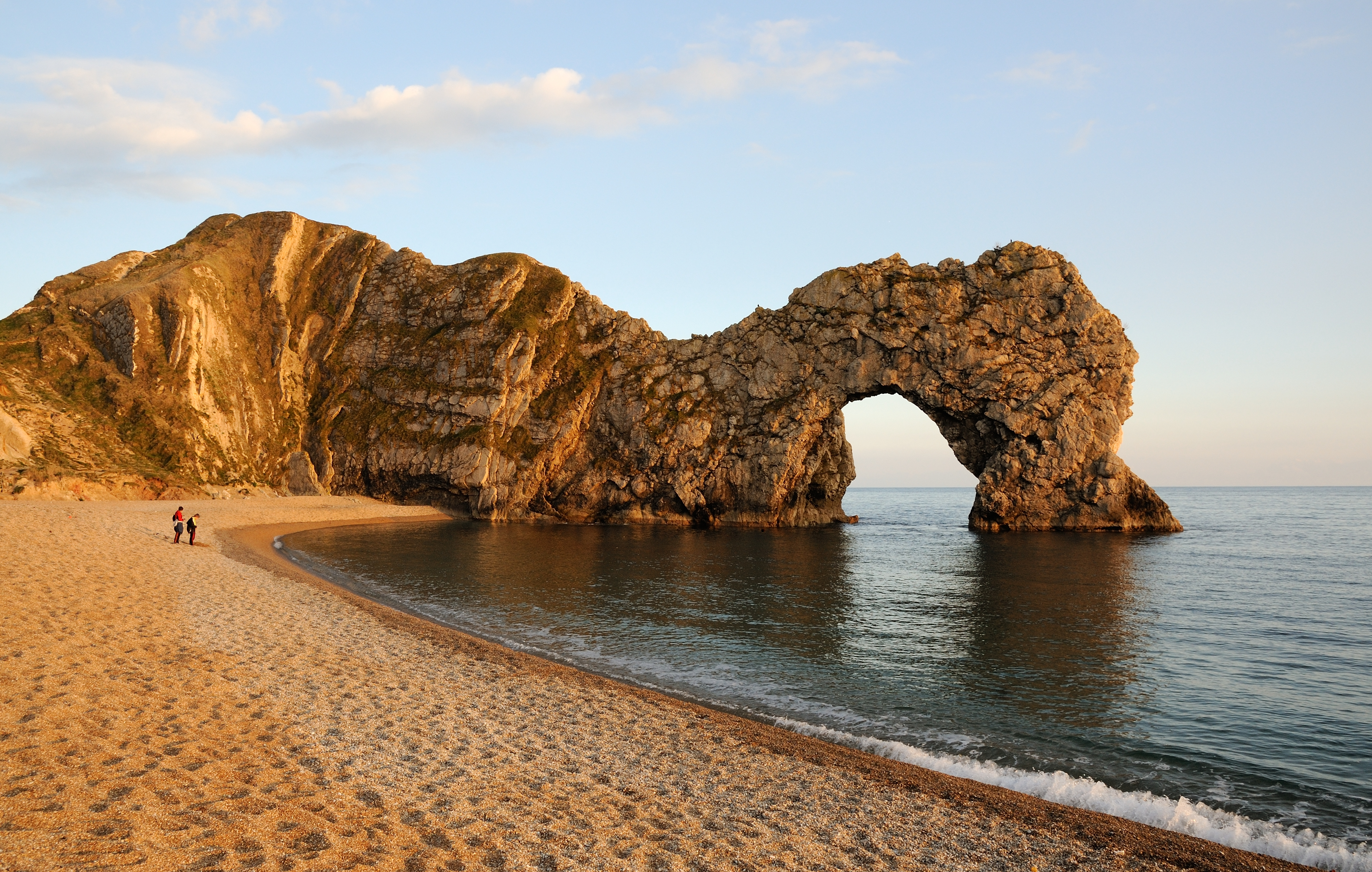
Durdle Door, Dorset, the United Kingdom

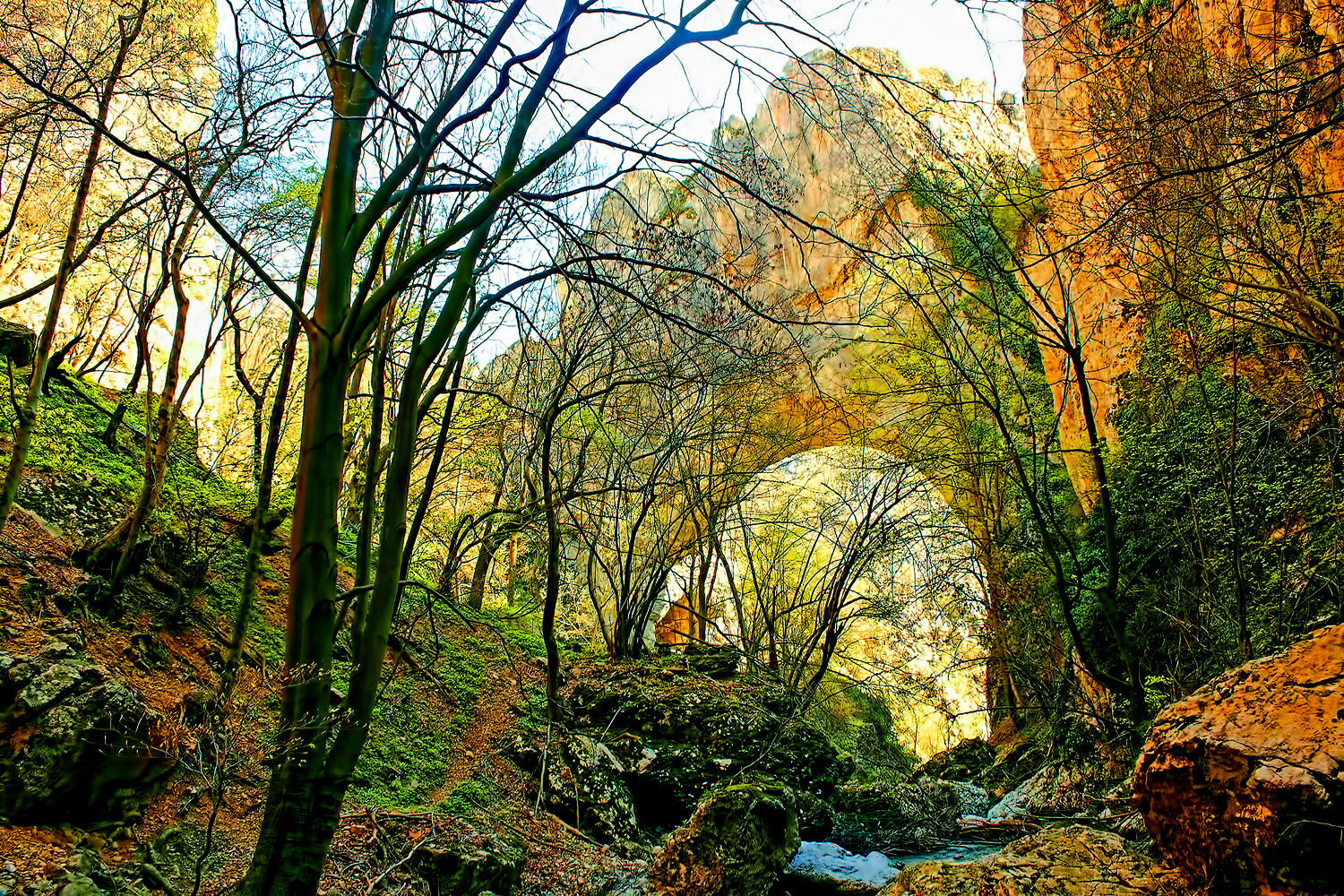
Little Prerast in eastern Serbia

- Albandeira Arch, Lagoa, Algarve, Portugal
- Arco Naturale, Capri, Italy
- As Catedrais beach, Ribadeo, Spain
- Azure Window, Gozo, Malta (collapsed in 2017)
- Blue Window or the Seal cave of the Corinthian Gulf, in the front of the Alcyonides islands, Greece
- Bow Fiddle Rock, Portknockie, Scotland
- Capu Tafunatu, France
- Chaos de Montpellier-le-Vieux, France
- Devil's Gate (Crimea)
- Dore Holm, Shetland Islands
- Drangarnir, Faroe Islands
- Durdle Door, Dorset, England
- Dyrhólaey, Iceland
- Els Arcs, Castell de Castells, Spain
- Es Pontàs, Spain
- Étretat, France
- Geropotamos bridge, Crete, Greece
- Għar Qawqla, Gozo, Malta (collapsed in the 20th century)
- Green Bridge of Wales, Pembrokeshire, Wales
- Hajdučka vrata, Čvrsnica mountain, Bosnia and Herzegovina
- Stone Passage on Dobropoljka (Bistrica) river, Bosnia and Herzegovina
- Stone Passage on Paljanska Miljacka, Bosnia and Herzegovina
- Inland Sea, Gozo, Malta
- Kuhstall, Germany
- Lalaria beach arch, Skiathos Island, Greece
- Malá Pravčická brána, Czech Republic
- Marinha Beach, Caramujeira, Lagoa, Algarve, Portugal
- Marsden Rock, South Shields, England (collapsed in 1996)
- Marvelous Bridges, Bulgaria
- Monte Forato, Tuscany, Italy
- Ófærufoss, Iceland (collapsed in winter 1992/1993)
- Pistyll Rhaeadr, Wales
- Ponoarele, Romania (Podul lui Dumnezeu, or God's Bridge)
- Pont d'Arc, France
- Pravčická brána, Czech Republic
- Puentedey, Spain (Puentedei, or God's Bridge)
- Trypitòs Arch of Paxi Island, Greece
- Samar Natural Arch, Serbia
- Šuplja Stena Natural Arch, Serbia
- Tour Percée, France
- Wied il-Mielaħ Window, Gozo, Malta
- Vratna Gates, Serbia

=== North America ===
==== Canada ====
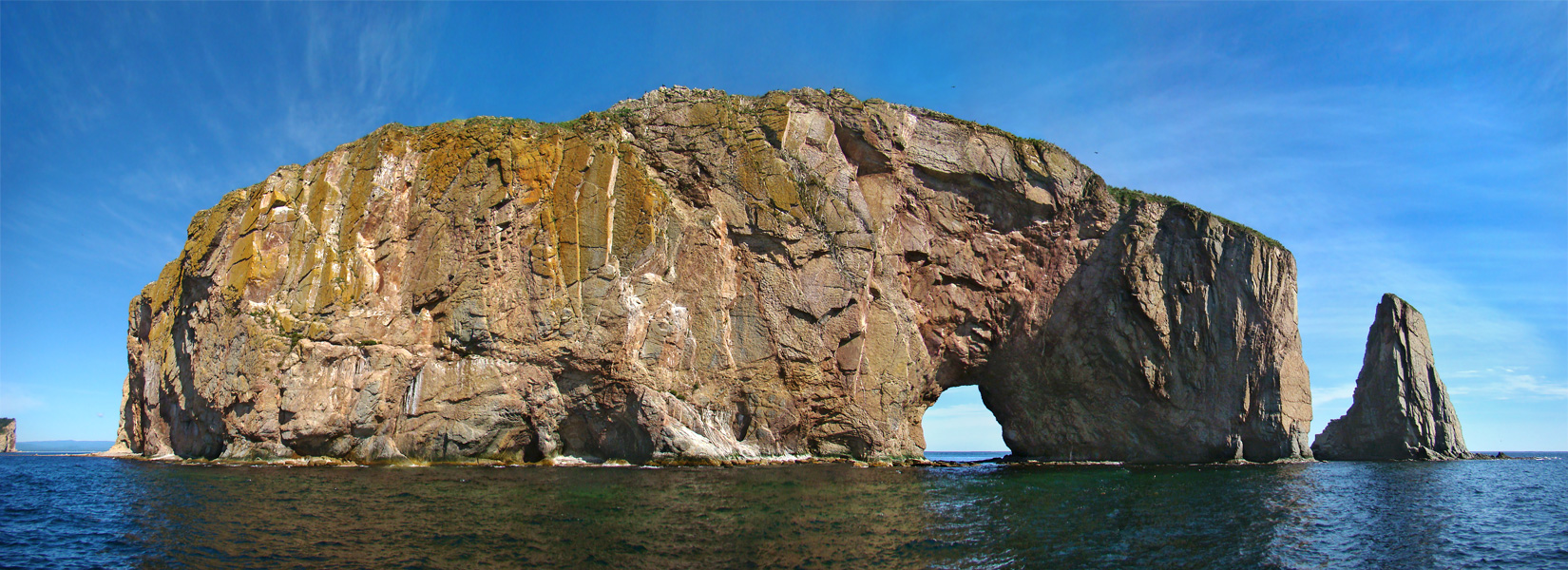
Percé Rock, Quebec, Canada

- Percé Rock, Quebec

==== Caribbean ====
- Natural Bridge, Aruba (collapsed in 2005)

==== Mexico ====
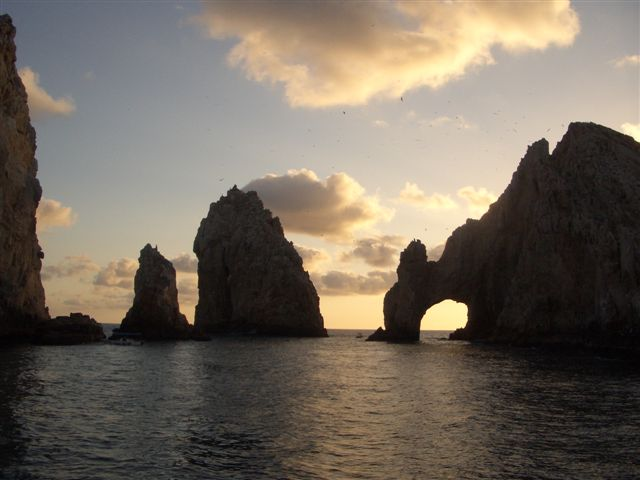
The Arch of Cabo San Lucas, Mexico

- El Arco de Cabo San Lucas, Baja California Sur

==== United States ====
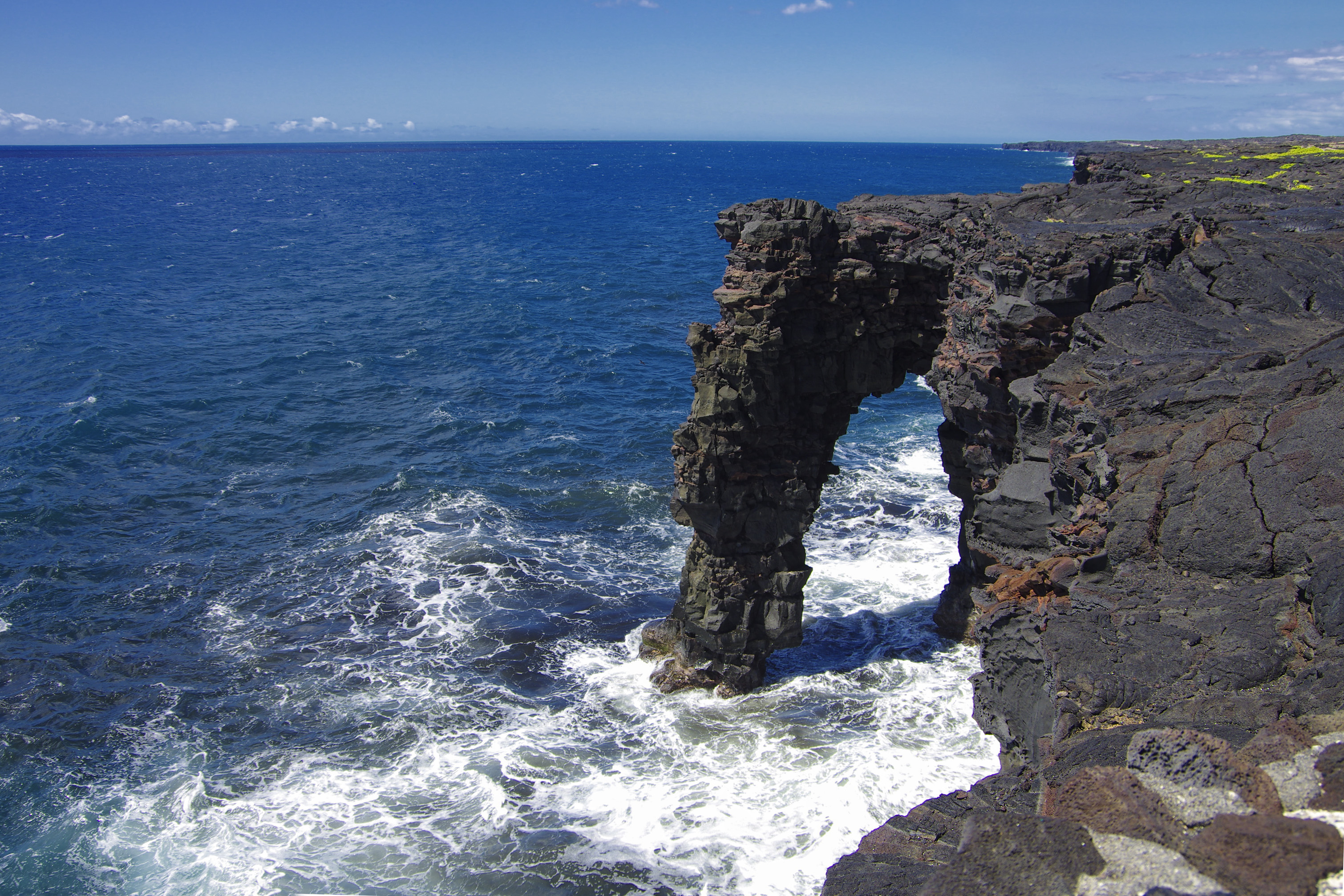
Hōlei Sea Arch, Hawaii Volcanoes National Park, Hawaii, United States, before its collapse in 2026

Landscape Arch, Utah, United States – one of the longest natural arches in the world

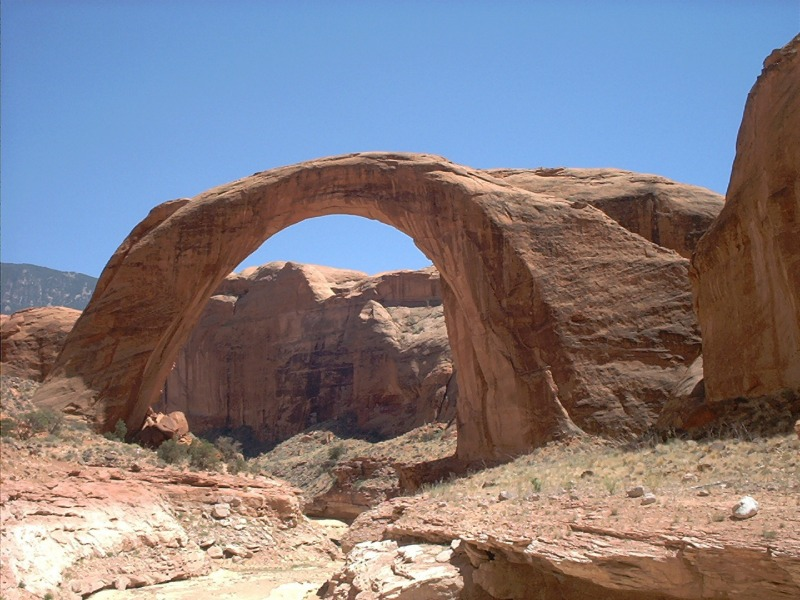
Rainbow Bridge, Utah, a natural bridge formed by a meandering watercourse

- Anacapa Island, Channel Islands National Park, California
- Angel Arch, Utah
- Arch Creek, Florida
- Arch Rock, Michigan
- Arturos Bridge, California
- Ayres Natural Bridge Park, Wyoming
- Balcony Bridge, California
- Bell Smith Springs, Illinois
- Blackwater Natural Bridge, Wyoming
- Bryce Canyon National Park, Utah
- Corona Arch, Utah
- Creelsboro Natural Bridge, Kentucky
- Delicate Arch, Utah
- Devil's Doorway (Wisconsin)
- Druid Arch, Utah
- Eye of the Needle, Montana
- Goat Rock Beach, California
- Great Arch Rock, Farallon Islands, California
- Great West Arch, Farallon Islands, California
- Grosvenor Arch, Utah
- Hōlei Sea Arch, Hawaii Volcanoes National Park, Hawaii (collapsed in 2026)
- Honopū Arch, Hawaii
- Hickman Bridge, Utah
- Koger Arch, Kentucky
- Kolob Arch, Zion National Park, Utah
- Landscape Arch, Utah
- La Ventana Natural Arch, New Mexico
- Mesa Arch, Utah
- Mobius Arch, California
- Natural Arch, Kentucky
- Natural Bridge, Virginia
- Natural Bridge Caverns, Texas
- Natural Bridge of Arkansas
- Natural Bridge Park, Alabama
- Natural Bridge State Park, Kentucky
- Natural Bridge State Park, Massachusetts
- Natural Bridge State Park, Wisconsin
- Natural Bridges National Monument, Utah
- Natural Bridges State Beach, California
- Rainbow Bridge National Monument, Utah
- Rattlesnake Canyon, Colorado
- Rialto Beach, Olympic National Park, Washington
- Rock Bridge Memorial State Park, Missouri
- Rockbridge State Nature Preserve, Ohio
- Sewanee Natural Bridge, Tennessee
- Sipapu Bridge, Utah
- An arch at Tettegouche State Park, Minnesota, collapsed in 2010.
- Three Arch Rocks National Wildlife Refuge, Oregon
- Tonto Natural Bridge, Arizona
- Twin Arches, Big South Fork National River and Recreation Area, Tennessee
- Window Rock, Arizona
- Wrather Arch, Arizona
- Yahoo Arch, Kentucky

=== Oceania ===
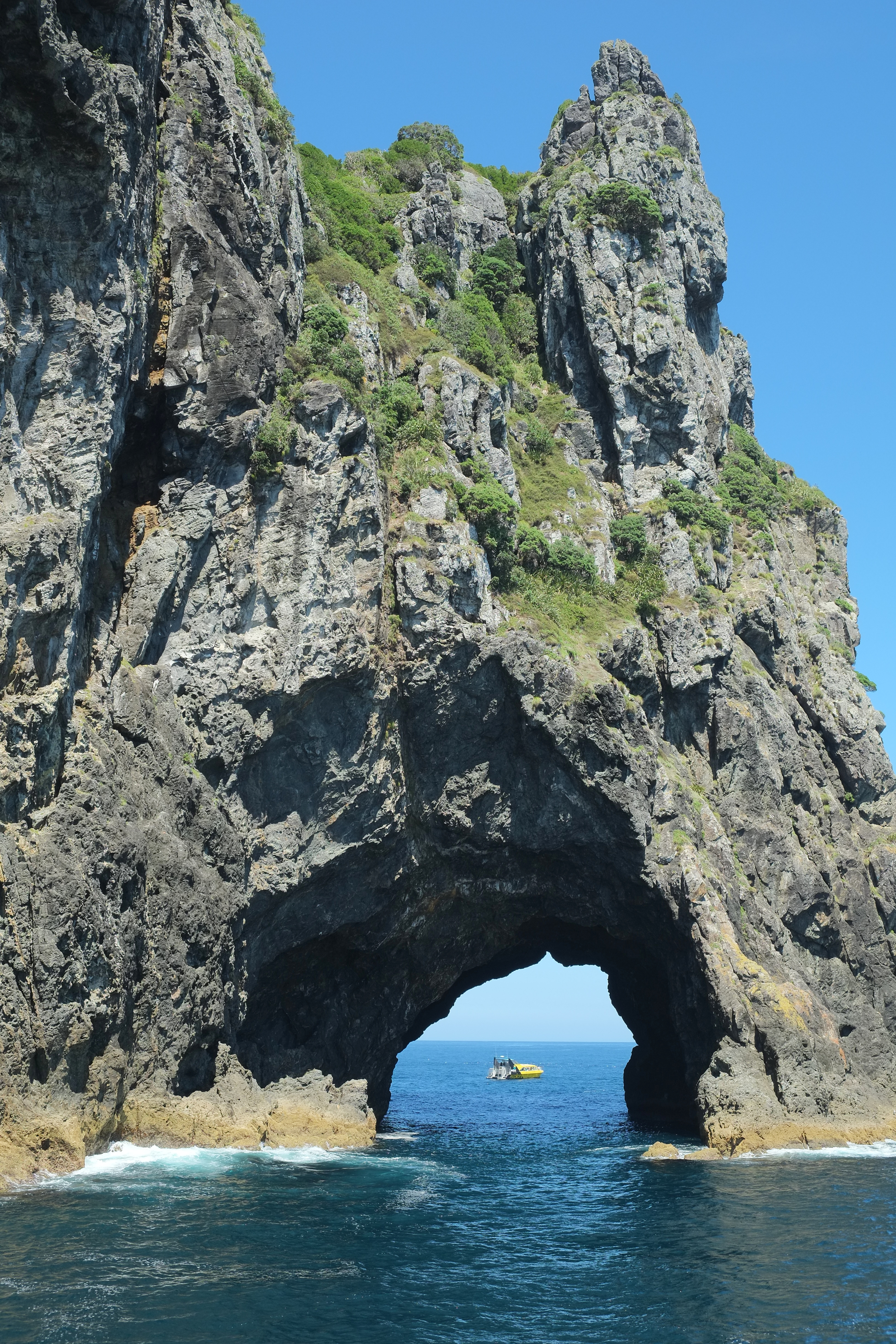
"The Hole in the Rock" on Piercy Island, Cape Brett, New Zealand

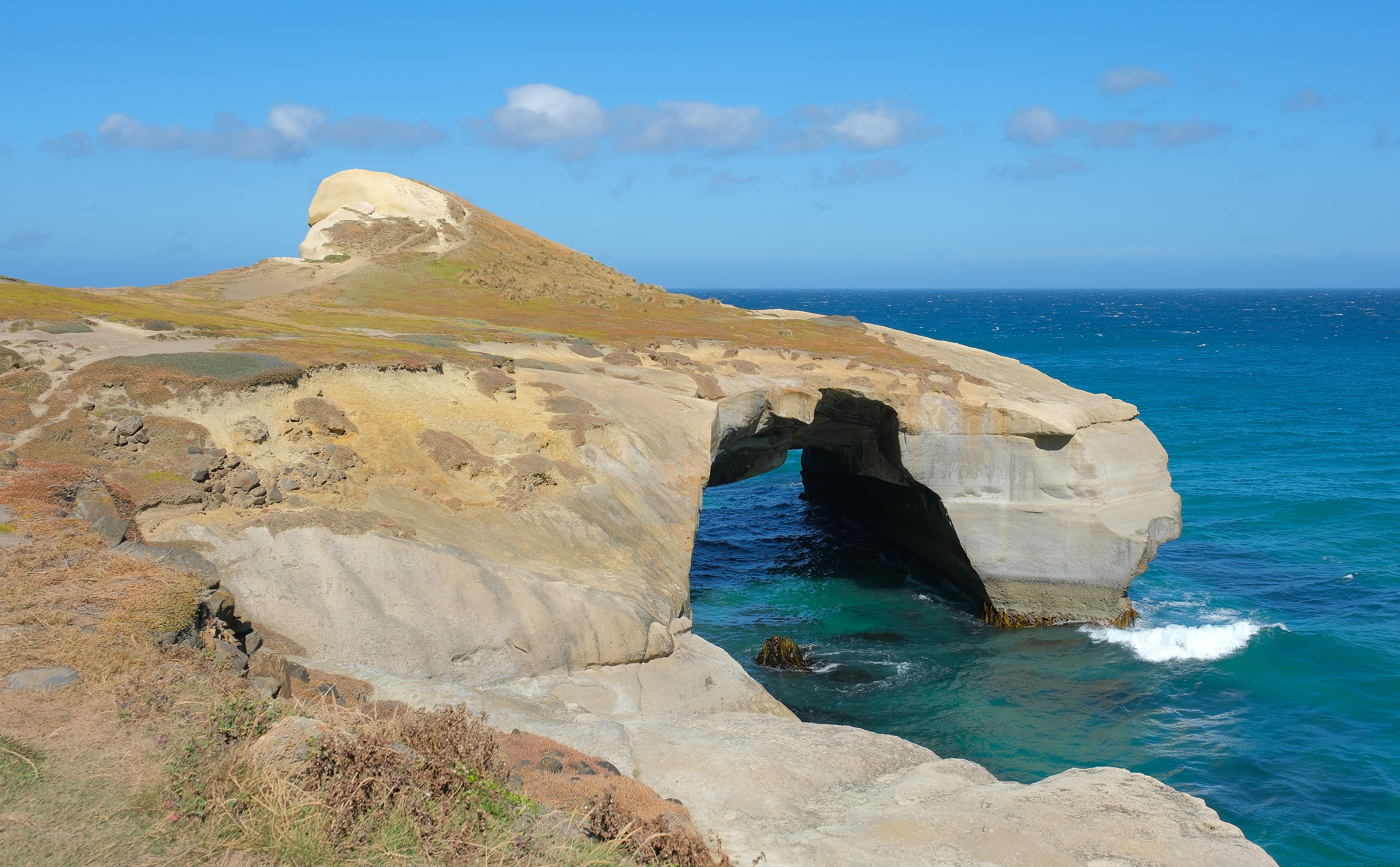
The arch at Tunnel Beach, Dunedin, New Zealand

==== Australia ====
- London Bridge, Port Campbell National Park, Victoria, Australia (one of the two spans collapsed in 1990)
- Natural Bridge, Springbrook National Park, Queensland, Australia
- Nature's Window, Kalbarri National Park. Western Australia, Australia

==== New Zealand ====
- Mangapohue Natural Bridge, New Zealand
- Oparara Basin Arches, New Zealand
- "The Hole in the Rock", Piercy Island, Cape Brett, New Zealand
- Tunnel Beach arch, Dunedin, New Zealand
- Spörings Arch, Tolaga Bay, New Zealand
- Mercury Bay, New Zealand (collapsed)

=== South America ===
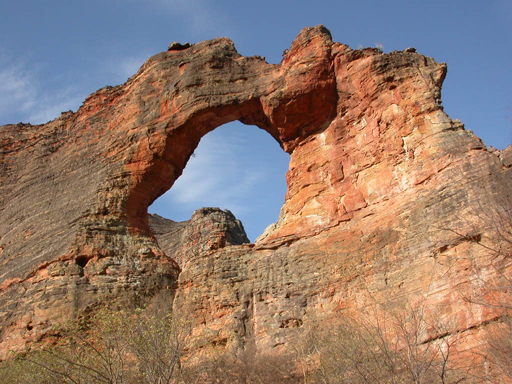
Stone arch at Pedra Furada, Piauí, Brazil

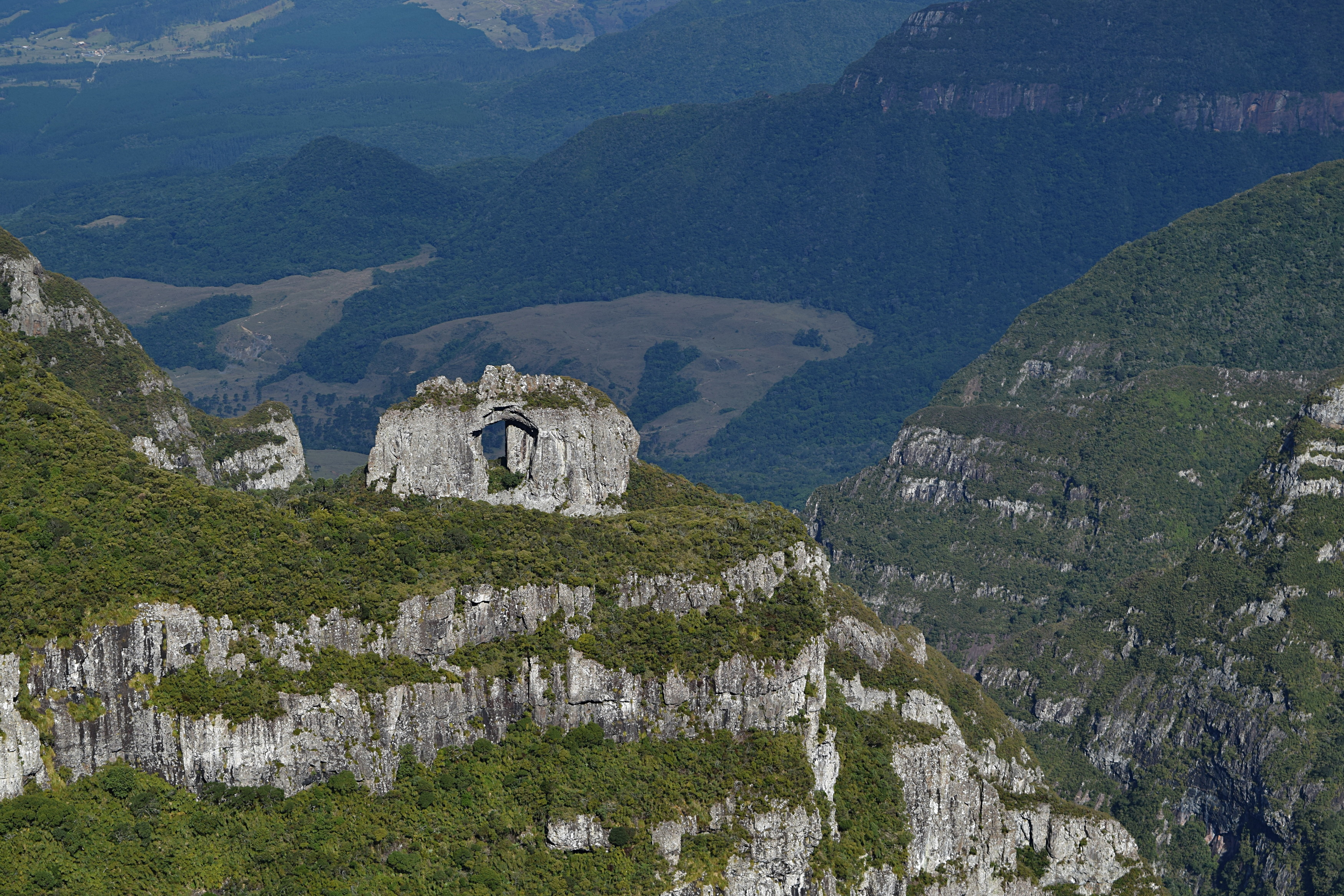
Pedra Furada, Santa Catarina, Brazil

- Arch Islands, Falkland Islands
- Darwin's Arch, Galápagos Islands, Ecuador (collapsed in 2021)
- Icononzo, Colombia
- La Portada, Chile
- Pedra Furada, Ceará, Brazil
- Pedra Furada, Piauí, Brazil
- Pedra Furada, Santa Catarina, Brazil
- Puente del Inca, Argentina
- Sete Cidades National Park, Brazil
- San Rafael Falls, Ecuador (formed in 2020, collapsed in 2021)
- La Catedral, Paracas National Reserve, Peru (Collapsed in 2007)

== See also ==
- List of longest natural arches
