= Rainbow Bridge National Monument =

Natural bridge in San Juan County, Utah, United States

- Tséʼnaa Naʼníʼáhí (Navajo)
- IUCN category III (natural monument or feature)
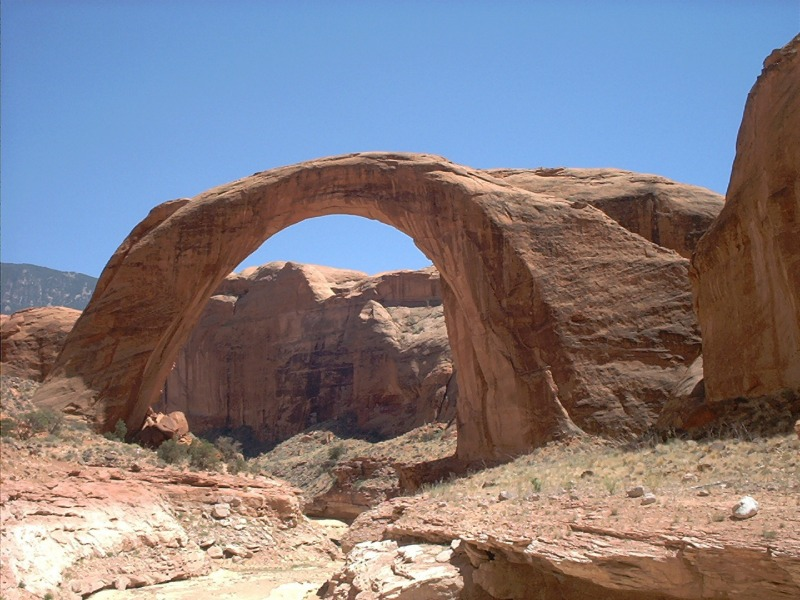
- Interactive map of Rainbow Bridge National Monument
- Location: San Juan County, Utah, United States
- Nearest city: Page, Arizona
- Coordinates: 37°04′38″N 110°57′51″W
- Area: 160 acres (65 ha)
- Created: May 30, 1910
- Visitors: 86,369 (in 2016)
- Governing body: National Park Service
- Website: Rainbow Bridge National Monument

Rainbow Bridge is a natural arch in southern Utah, United States. With a span of 275 feet (84 m), as reported in 1974 by the Bureau of Reclamation, and height of 290 feet (88 m), it is one of the largest natural arches in the world. At the top it is 42 feet (13 m) thick and 33 feet (10 m) wide. The bridge, which is of cultural importance to a number of area Native American tribes, has been designated a Traditional Cultural Property by the National Park Service. Rainbow Bridge National Monument was protected in 1910, and it is administered by Glen Canyon National Recreation Area.

== History ==
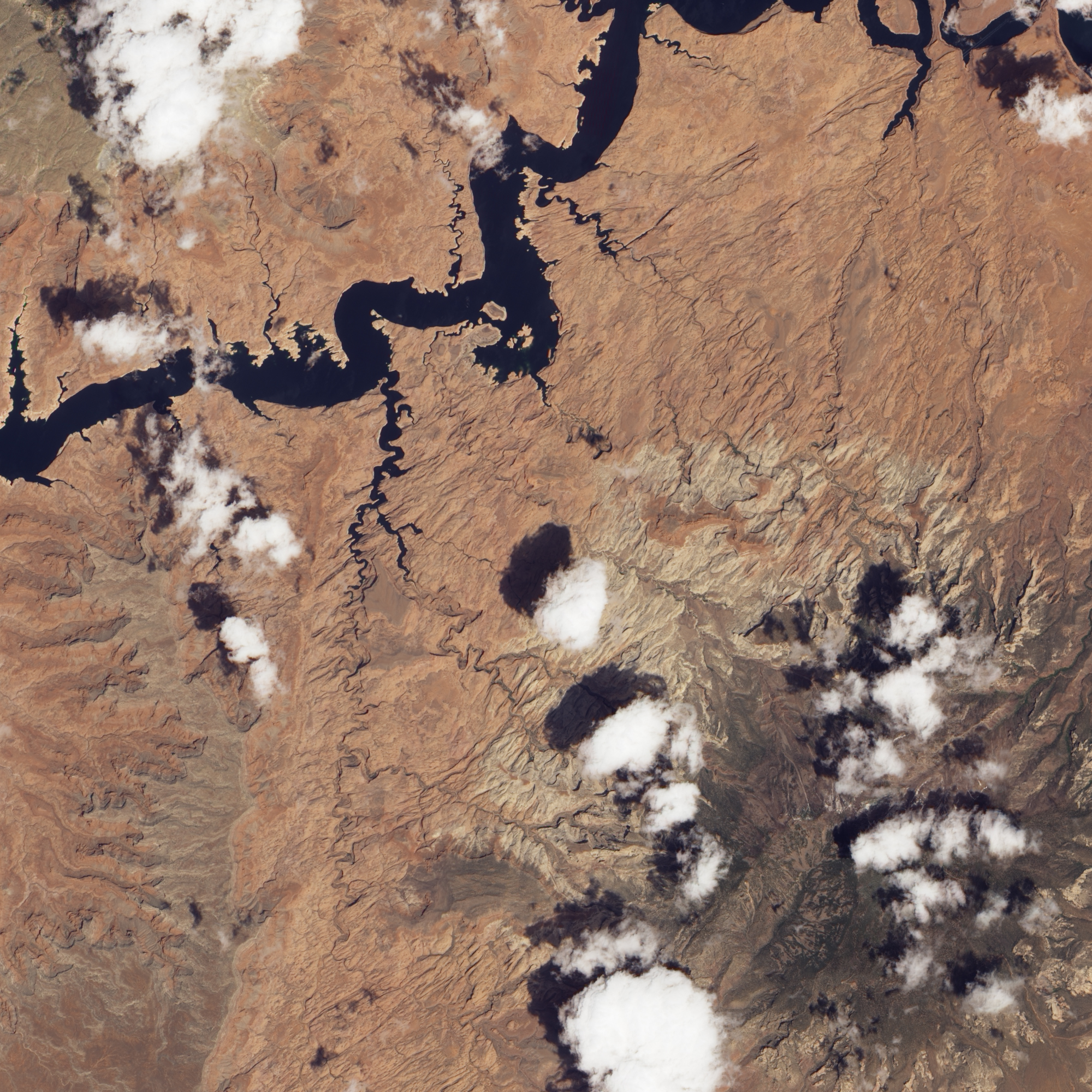
Rainbow Bridge National Monument from space

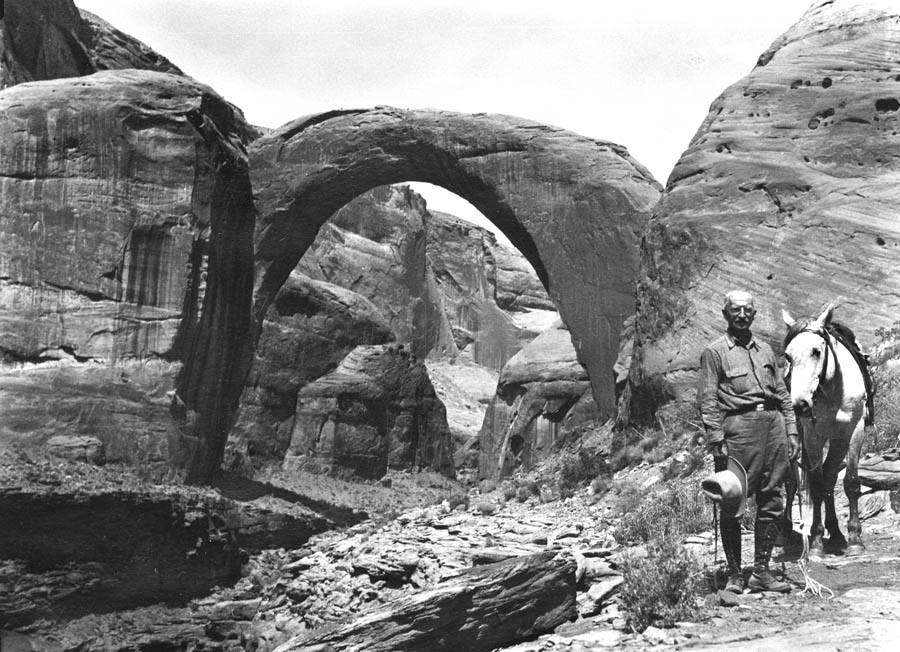
Byron Cummings at Rainbow Bridge, 1909

Located in the rugged, isolated canyons at the feet of Navajo Mountain, Rainbow Bridge was known for centuries by the Native Americans who have long held the bridge sacred. Ancient Pueblo People were followed much later by Paiute and Navajo groups who named the bridge Nonnezoshe or "rainbow turned to stone". Several Native American families still reside nearby.

By the 1800s, Rainbow Bridge was probably seen by wandering trappers, prospectors, and cowboys. Not until 1909, though, was its existence publicized to the outside world. Two separate exploration parties—one headed by University of Utah Dean Byron Cummings, and another by government surveyor, W. B. Douglass—began searching for the legendary span. Eventually, they combined efforts. Paiute guides Nasja Begay and Jim Mike led the way, along with trader and explorer John Wetherill. Late in the afternoon of August 15, coming down what is now Bridge Canyon, the party saw Rainbow Bridge for the first time.

The next year, on May 30, 1910, U.S. President William Howard Taft used presidential proclamation to designate Rainbow Bridge National Monument. Teddy Roosevelt and Zane Grey were among the first visitors to make the trek by foot and horseback from Oljeto or Navajo Mountain. In 1924 S. I. and Hubert Richardson built a road north from Red Lake (Tonalea) to the west side of Navajo Mountain, where they built a rustic stone building and facilities for mules and visitors, calling it Rainbow Lodge. They established a trail from the lodge to Cliff Canyon, then over Redbud Pass to Bridge Canyon. The 14-mile trip from the lodge to Rainbow Bridge could be made in one day by mule or horse. Bill and Catherine Wilson operated the lodge from 1928 to 1951, except for the World War II years. In 1942 Barry Goldwater (later US Senator and presidential candidate) acquired a half interest in the lodge. The main building at the site burned in August 1951. Merritt and Winona Holloway operated the lodge in 1952, using a garage building as a dining hall. Miles Headrick conducted some trips from the lodge site for the next few years, before the site was abandoned. The site is now the trailhead for hikers to the bridge. Due to erosion, Redbud Pass is no longer passable for horses.

Rainbow Bridge became more accessible with the popularity of river running in Glen Canyon after World War II, although the trip still required several days floating the Colorado River plus a six-mile hike up-canyon. By the early 1950s, people could travel upstream by jet boat from Lee's Ferry. Glen Canyon Dam was authorized in 1956. By 1963, the gates on the dam closed and rising Lake Powell began to engulf the river and its side canyons. Higher water made motorboat access to Rainbow Bridge much easier, bringing thousands of visitors each year.

In 1974, Navajo tribal members who lived in the history of Rainbow Bridge filed suit in U.S. District Court against the Secretary of the Interior, the Commissioner of the Bureau of Reclamation, and the Director of the National Park Service. The suit was an attempt to preserve important Navajo religious sites that were being inundated by the rising waters of Lake Powell. The court ruled against the Navajo, saying that the need for water storage outweighed their concerns. In 1980, the Tenth Circuit Court of Appeals ruled that to close Rainbow Bridge, a public site, for Navajo religious ceremonies would violate the U.S. Constitution which protects the religious freedom of all citizens.

By 1993, a National Park Service General Management Plan, involving much public input, was adopted. As part of the planning process, the National Park Service consulted with the five Native American nations affiliated with Rainbow Bridge: the Navajo, Hopi, San Juan Southern Paiute, Kaibab Paiute, and White Mesa Ute. Chief among their concerns was that Rainbow Bridge—a religious and sacred place—be protected and visited in a respectful manner. Additionally, the tribes expressed concerns about visitors approaching or walking under the bridge. Today, the National Park Service asks visitors to be respectful of its significance to the people who have long held Rainbow Bridge sacred. It is not illegal, however, for visitors to approach and walk under the bridge from one side to the other along or just above the creek bed, and there is a well-worn path under the bridge that is regularly used.

== Geology ==
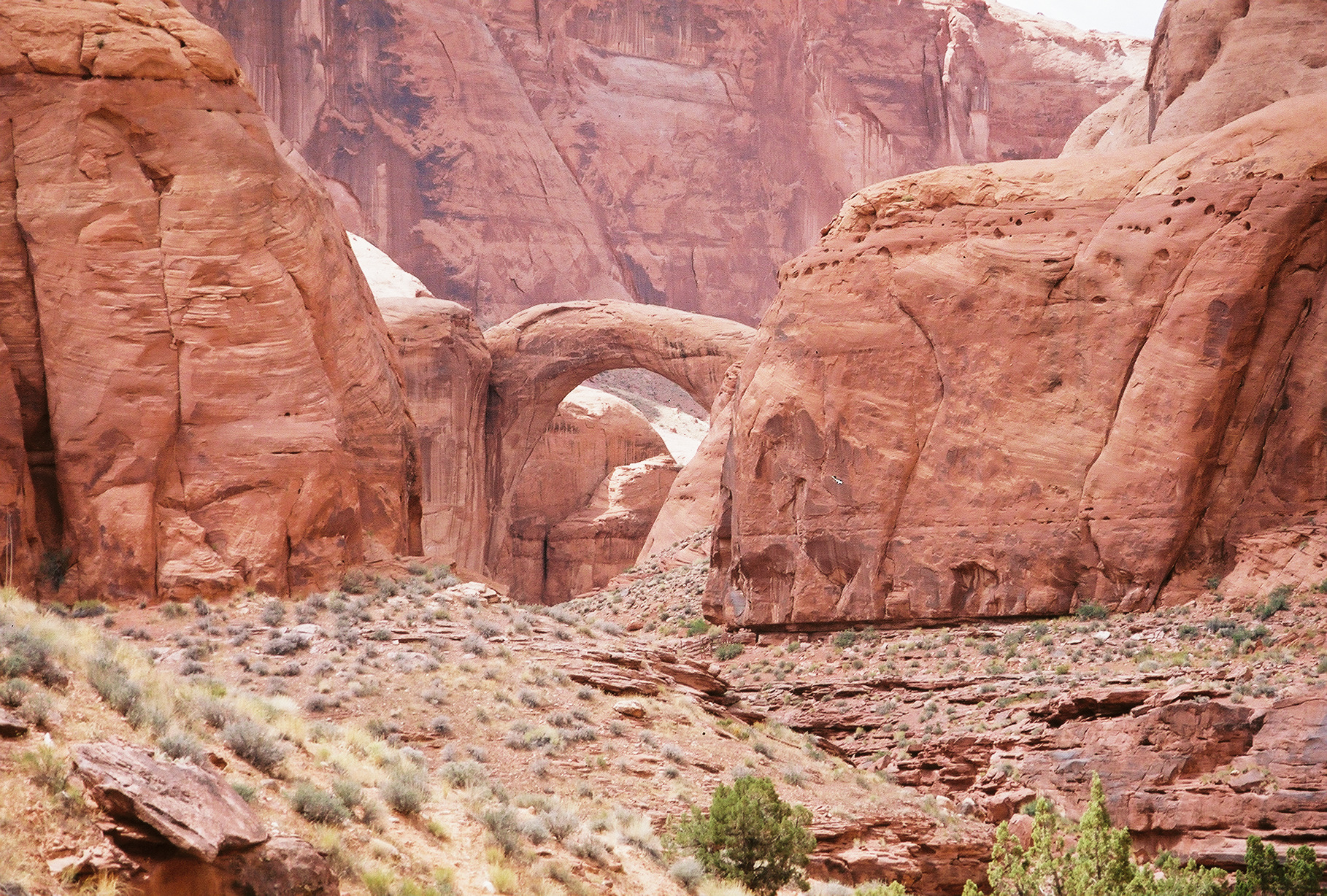
Rainbow Bridge and surrounding canyon seen from the Navajo Mountain side

Rainbow Bridge is made up of sandstone originally deposited by wind as sand dunes during the end of the Triassic and the Jurassic periods. The bridge lintel consists of Navajo Sandstone while Bridge Creek incises the Kayenta Formation below. Extreme fluctuations in climate during the Triassic and Jurassic periods—the region was alternately a sea and desert on par with the Sahara—produced layers of sandstone with different levels of hardness. By the end of the Jurassic, the sea returned to cover these layers of sandstone and compressed them so tightly that they would persist until the present day.

As Bridge Creek flowed toward the growing Colorado River during the last ice age, it carved first through softer rocks and veered away from the harder Triassic and Jurassic sandstones, eventually creating a wide hairpin bend that flowed around a solid "fin" of sandstone that would become Rainbow Bridge. The previous course of the creek is still visible above the bridge. Water flows back on itself at bends and wide spots, creating swirling eddies along the banks. As the creek flowed around Rainbow Bridge fin, these abrasive eddies formed on both the upstream and downstream sides and cut circular alcoves in the rock wall. The sediment in the creek eventually scoured the softer layers of sandstone away, leaving the harder layers behind.

== Access ==
Rainbow Bridge is one of the most accessible of the large arches of the world. It can be reached by a two-hour boat ride on Lake Powell from either of two marinas near Page, Arizona, followed by a mile-long walk (variable depending on Lake Powell water level) from the National Park wharf in Bridge Canyon. It is also possible to hike one or more days overland from a trailhead on the southwest side of Navajo Mountain (former site of Rainbow Lodge), which requires both hiking experience and a permit obtained from the Navajo Nation in Window Rock, Arizona.

== Size comparison ==
Two other natural arches, Kolob Arch and Landscape Arch, both also in southern Utah, have confirmed spans several meters longer than Rainbow Bridge, but by most definitions of the terms they are considered to be arches rather than bridges. With a height of 290 feet (88 m) Rainbow Bridge stands taller than either of its longer competitors, but it is outdone by Aloba Arch in Chad at 394 feet (120 m). The world's tallest (though less easily accessible) arch is Shipton's Arch in China, at an estimated 1,200 feet (370 m). Xianren Bridge (also known as Fairy Bridge), in Guangxi Province, China, with a span of about 295 feet (90 m), and a height of the opening of 210 feet (64 m), appears to be the natural bridge with the largest span in the world.

== See also ==
- List of national monuments of the United States
