= Hōlei Sea Arch =

Former geological feature in Hawaiʻi

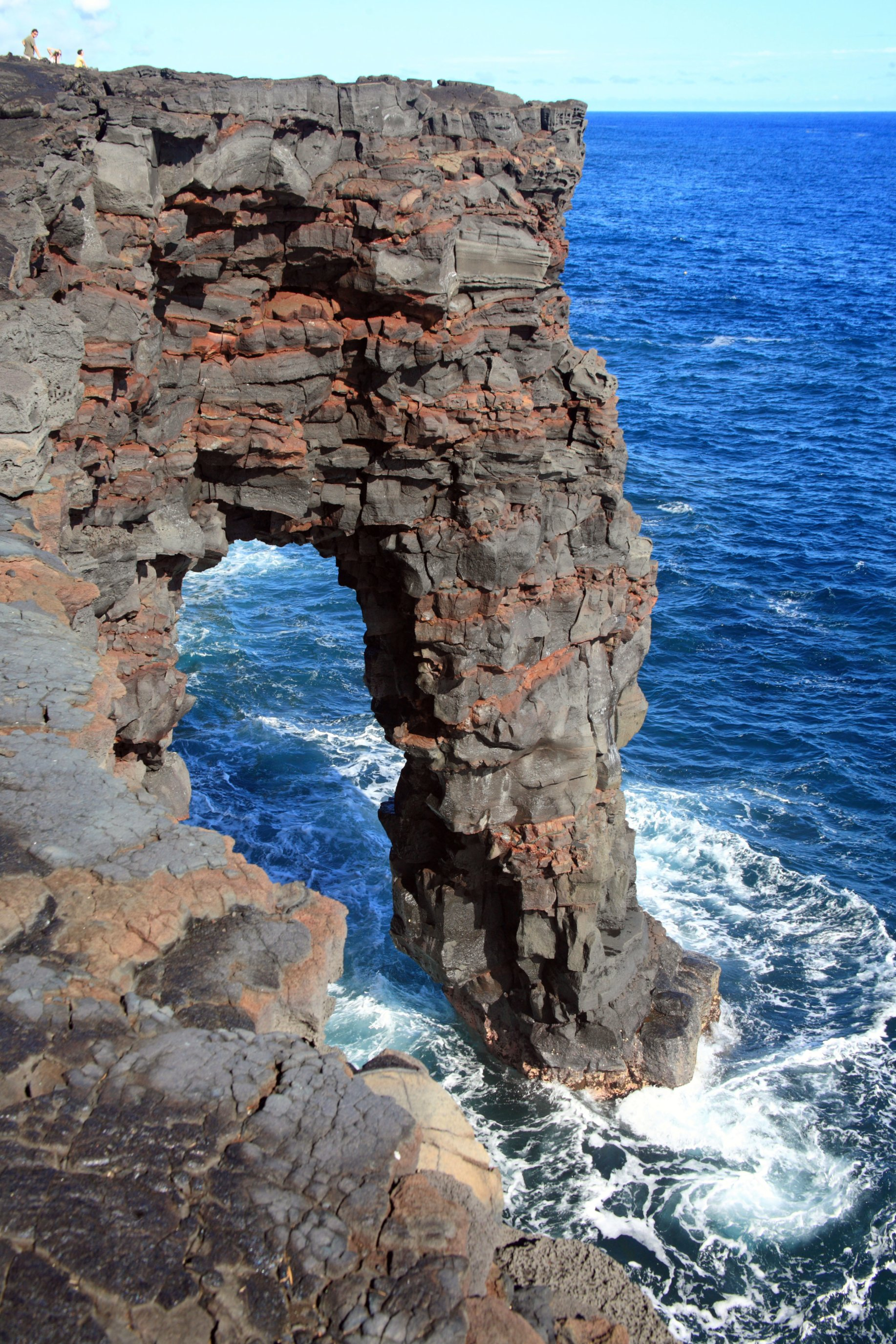
- View of Hōlei Sea Arch in 2010

- Location within Hawaii
- Location: Big Island, Hawaii, United States
- Nearest city: Kalapana, Hawaii
- Coordinates: 19°17′40.2″N 155°5′52.5″W
- Elevation: 90 ft (27 m)

Hōlei Sea Arch was a 90-foot (27 m) high natural arch located in Hawaiʻi, on the southern coast of the Big Island, south of Kīlauea. This rock formation was born from marine erosion, in which the waves of the Pacific Ocean create this natural bridge of lava cliffs. The arch was made of basalt. It took its name from the Hōlei Pali, the escarpment located up on the slopes of the volcano.

Located in the Ka'ū District of Hawaii County and in the Hawaiʻi Volcanoes National Park, the tourist attraction was at the end of the Chain of Craters Road which was cut short by the lava flows emitted by Puʻu ʻŌʻō Crater in 1990. A total of four people in the past decade have fallen off to their death.

Between September 23 and 27, 2026, the arch had collapsed amidst the passage of Hurricane Nolo. The National Park Service confirmed its collapse on October 1; the exact date and time is unknown.

== Transportation ==
The arch was accessible by car via the Chain of Craters Road from Halemaʻumaʻu, the main Kīlauea caldera.
