= Ponoarele =

- Commune
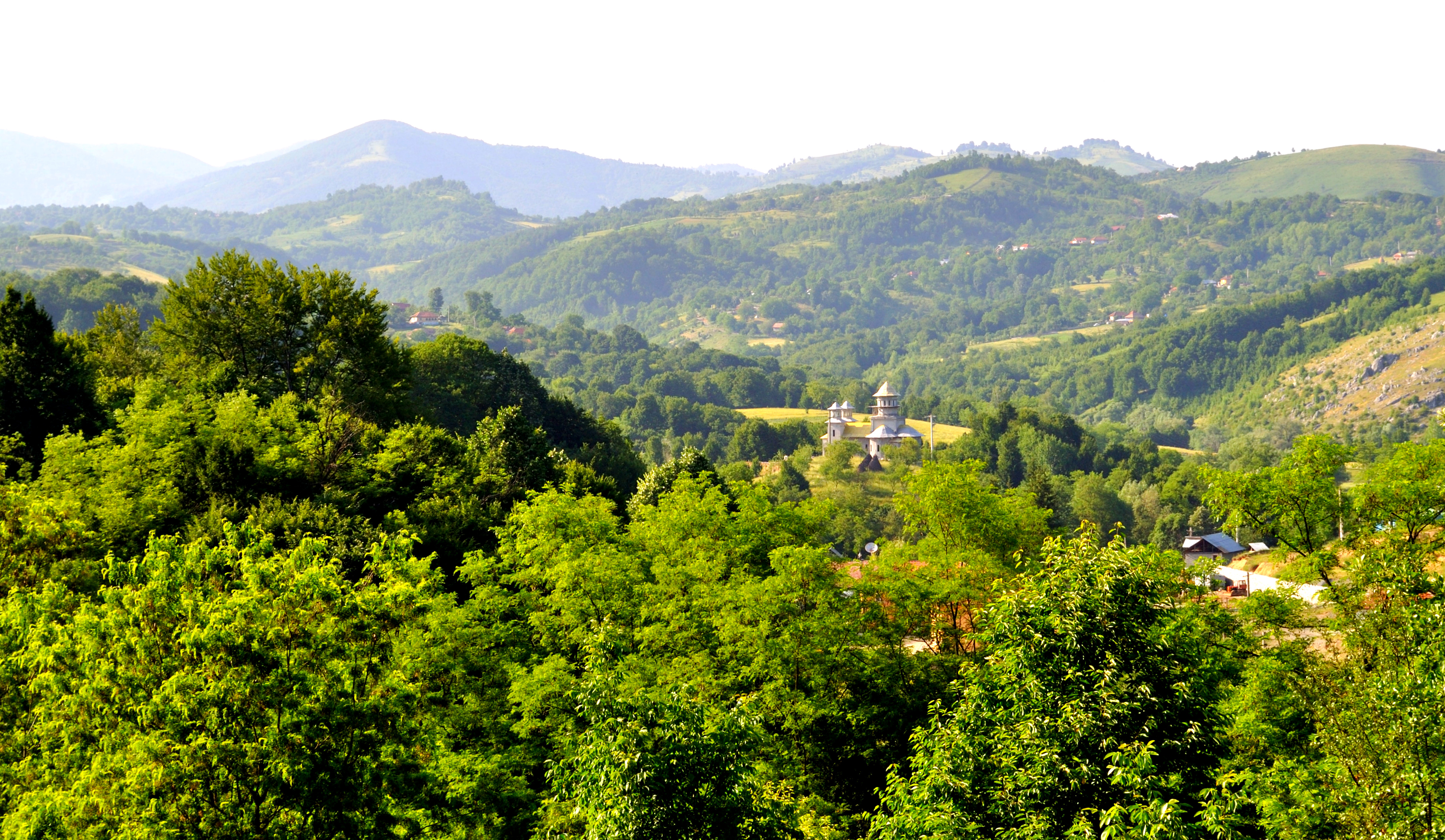
- Ponoarele

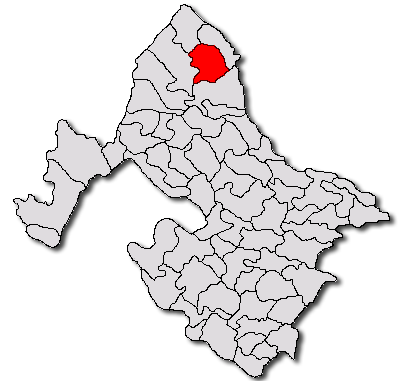
- Location in Mehedinți County

- Location in Romania
- Coordinates: 44°58′N 22°47′E
- Country: Romania
- County: Mehedinți

Government
  - Mayor (2020–2024): Georgică Pătrașcu (PSD)
- Area: 70.88 km^{2} (27.37 sq mi)
- Elevation: 353 m (1,158 ft)
- Population (2021-12-01): 2,249
  - Density: 31.73/km^{2} (82.18/sq mi)
- Time zone: UTC+02:00 (EET)
  - Summer (DST): UTC+03:00 (EEST)
- Postal code: 227360
- Area code: +(40) 252
- Vehicle reg.: MH
- Website: ponoarele.ro

Ponoarele is a commune located in Mehedinți County, Oltenia, Romania. It is composed of fifteen villages: Băluța, Bârâiacu, Brânzeni, Buicani, Ceptureni, Cracu Muntelui, Delureni, Gărdăneasa, Gheorghești, Ludu, Ponoarele, Proitești, Răiculești, Șipotu, and Valea Ursului.

The commune has many natural monuments, including Podul lui Dumnezeu (God's Bridge), Peștera Bulba (Bulba Cave), Câmpul de Lapiezuri, Lacul Zaton (Zaton Lake), Peștera Ponoarele (Ponoarele Cave), Valea Morilor (Valley of the Mills), and Pădurea de liliac (Lilac forest).

== Local holidays ==
- Sărbătoarea liliacului Ponoarele
- Festivalul național "Ponoare, Ponoare"
