= Hazarchishma Natural Bridge =

Natural arch in Afghanistan

Coordinates: 35°17′23″N 67°00′47″E

Hazarchishma Natural Bridge (Persian: پل طبیعی هزارچشمه) is a natural arch located in central Afghanistan, and the world's 12th largest natural bridge. The bridge spans 64.2 meters (211.0 feet) across its base, and its elevation is 3,100 meters (10,000 feet) above sea level, making it one of the highest large natural bridges in the world.

The bridge is located in the Hindu Kush mountains and approximately 100km north of Band-e Amir, a collection of six deep blue lakes separated by natural dams made of travertine, in the northern edge of Bamiyan Province in Afghanistan. Hazarchishma natural bridge was discovered in late 2010 by the Wildlife Conservation Society staff.

It is also home to ibex and urial wild sheep.
