= Shipton's Arch =

Natural arch in Xinjiang, China

Coordinates: 39°39′37.80″N 75°31′24.80″E

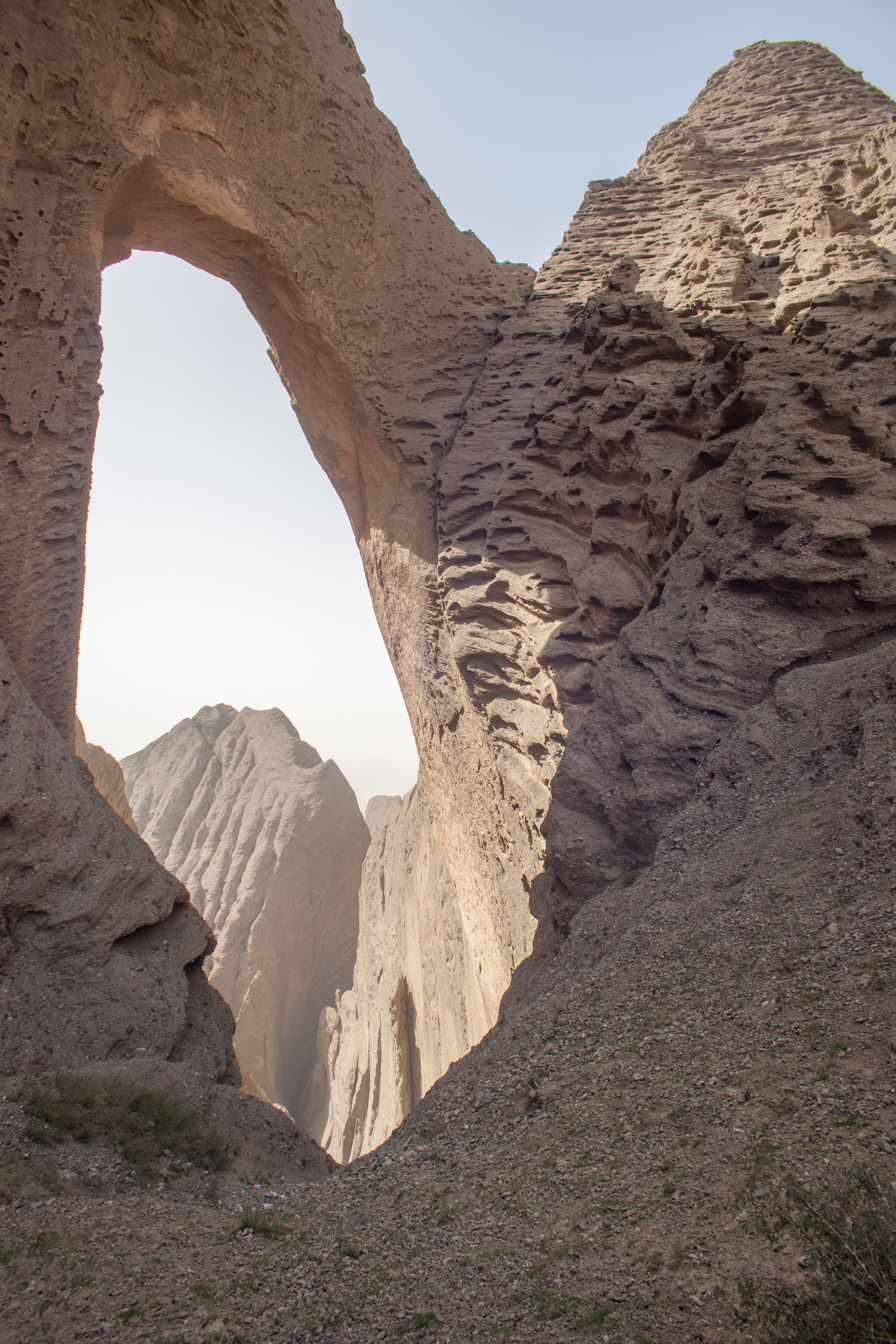
Shipton's Arch

Shipton's Arch (Note: Uyghur: تۆشۈك تاغ, Төшүк тағ, romanized: Töshük tagh, literally "Hole Mountain"; simplified Chinese: 阿图什天门; traditional Chinese: 阿圖什天門; pinyin: Ātúshí tiānmén; Wade–Giles: A^{1}t'u^{2}shih^{2} t'ien^{1}men^{2}; lit. 'Artux Heavenly Gate' or simply simplified Chinese: 天门; traditional Chinese: 天門; pinyin: Tiānmén; Wade–Giles: T'ien^{1}men^{2}; lit. 'Heavenly Gate'.) is a conglomerate natural arch in China's Xinjiang Uyghur Autonomous Region. It is located in Kizilsu Kirghiz Autonomous Prefecture west-northwest of Kashgar, near the village of Artux, at an altitude of 2,973 metres (9,754 ft).

It is probably the world's tallest natural arch. Though long familiar to locals, because the south side of the arch is visible at a distance from the plain below, a route to the arch was famously discovered in 1947 by English mountaineer Eric Shipton during his tenure as the British consul in Kashgar – and made known to the West in his book Mountains of Tartary. Shipton made unsuccessful attempts to reach the arch from the south, but was defeated each time by a maze of steep canyons and cliffs, before his party finally found a route to the arch from the north and photographed it. The arch once figured in the Guinness Book of Records for its exceptional height, but the editors of the book could not verify the location of the arch exactly, so the listing was dropped.

It was only as recently as May 2000 that an expedition sponsored by National Geographic rediscovered a route to the arch for the outside world. Today, several companies operating out of Kashgar offer day trips to the arch for tourists. The arch is about a one to two hour drive from Kashgar in addition to another one to two hour hike. It used to be that visitors were guided by locals and required to climb shaky ladders on their way to the arch but China has since invested money in a visitor center, staircases and a viewing deck.

The Gobi March 2008, an international stage race, took competitors to the top of the arch during its seven day, 250 kilometer footrace.

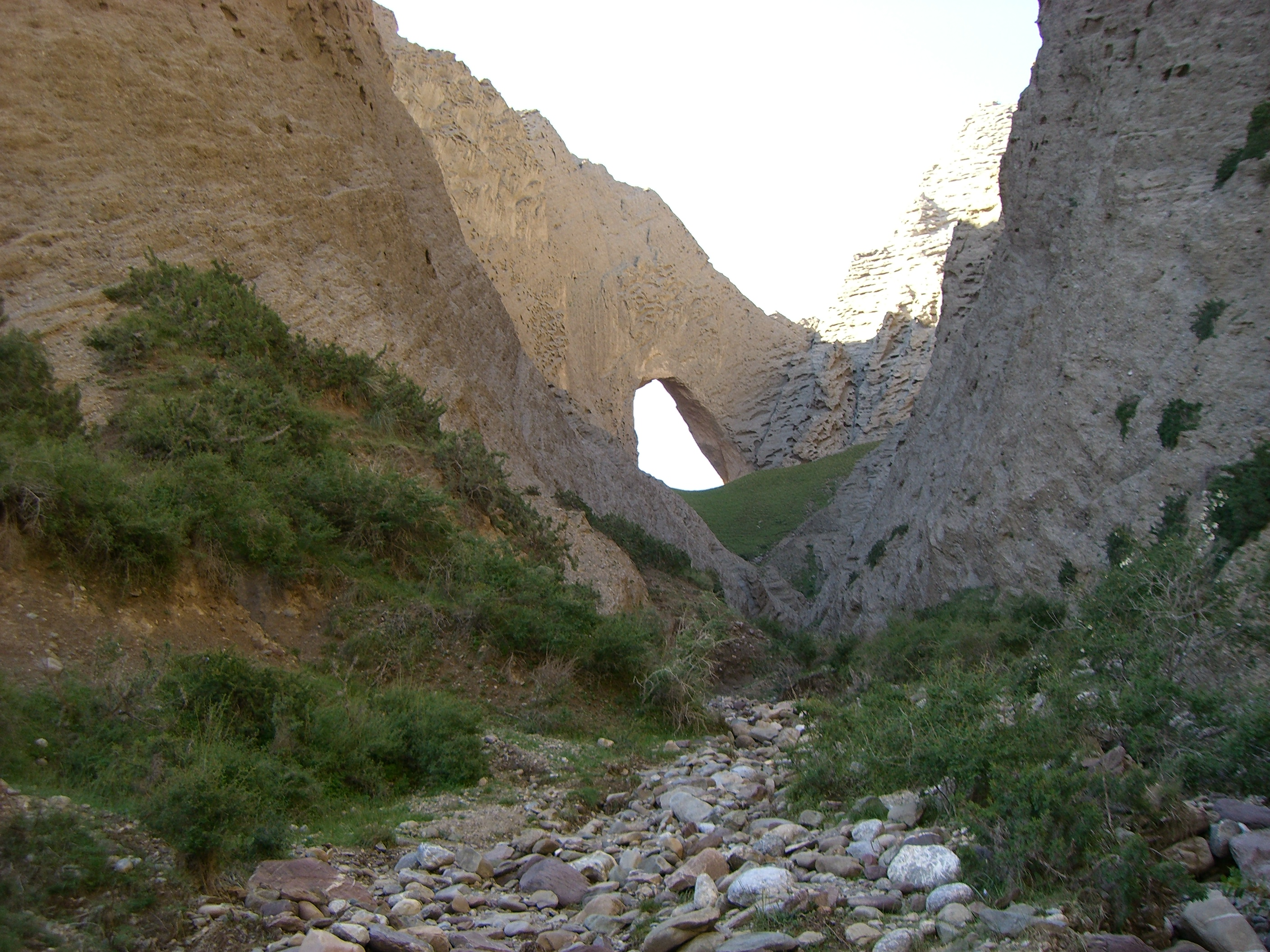
View from the base of the rubble pile

The height of the arch is estimated to be 1,500 feet (460 m), about the height of the Empire State Building. The span of the arch is roughly 180 feet (55 m). The true height of the arch is debatable: viewing the arch from the north (normal approach route) it appears to be 200 feet (61 m) tall from the top of the 100 feet (30 m) rubble pile; from the south side (approachable via a technical canyon ascent), the height is closer to the estimated 1,500 feet (460 m). The height depends upon what constitutes the base of the arch, which is either the base of the rubble pile (which is partially under the arch and where the span achieves its maximum width) or the floor of the west side canyon head, 900 feet (270 m) lower.
