= Muley =

Muley may refer to:

- Muley, a type of saw
- Big Muley, a lunar sample
- Muley Abul Hassan (died 1485), 21st Nasrid ruler of Granada
- Muley Xeque (1566–1621), Moroccan prince
- Muley El-Mehdi Mosque, a mosque in Ceuta

== See also ==
- Muley Point (disambiguation)
