= Endocarpon deserticola =

Scientific classification
- Kingdom: Fungi
- Division: Ascomycota
- Class: Eurotiomycetes
- Order: Verrucariales
- Family: Verrucariaceae
- Genus: Endocarpon
- Species: E. deserticola

Binomial name
- Endocarpon deserticola T.Zhang, X.L.Wei & J.C.Wei (2017)

Species of lichen

Endocarpon deserticola is a species of squamulose lichen in the family Verrucariaceae. This small, scale-like lichen was scientifically described in 2017 from specimens found in the desert environment of China's Tengger Desert, where it grows on sandy soil crusts. The species is characterised by having exceptionally numerous fruiting bodies densely packed across its surface—often 50 or more per scale. It plays an ecological role by helping to stabilise loose desert sands with its root-like structures.

== Taxonomy ==
Endocarpon deserticola was described in 2017 by Tao Zhang, Xin-Li Wei and Jiang-Chun Wei as one of two new Endocarpon species from the south-eastern edge of the Tengger Desert (Ningxia, China). The name means 'desert-dweller' (Latin desertum + -cola). The holotype was collected from biological soil crust on calcareous sand in the Shapotou experimental zone and is housed at HMAS (Herbarium Mycologicum Academiae Sinicae; lichen collection, HMAS-L). In a three-gene molecular analysis (nrITS plus two newly developed protein-coding markers, ADK and UCEH), the species formed a well-supported lineage within Endocarpon, distinct from the other sampled taxa. The authors emphasised that ADK and UCEH provided useful additional signal for species-level delimitation in the genus. The species is most easily separated phenotypically from the Australian E. helmsianum: E. deserticola has much narrower squamules and far smaller spores, but carries strikingly abundant perithecia scattered across nearly every squamule (often 15–60, sometimes 100+ per squamule).

== Description ==
Endocarpon deserticola is squamulose, forming discrete to contiguous scale-like lobes (squamules) 1–4 mm wide with slightly upturned margins. The upper surface is pale brown to brown; the underside has a well-developed dark cortex bearing brown to black, irregularly branched rhizines to about 4–6 mm long that anchor the lichen to the sand. The fruiting bodies are immersed, flask-shaped perithecia with a minute pore (ostiole); they are numerous—typically 15–60 (less often up to 100) per squamule—and about 200–275(–325) × 200–250 micrometres (μm). The perithecial wall is dark brown (paler near the ostiole). Asci contain two large, muriform spores—i.e., divided by multiple cross-walls into a brick-like pattern—that turn brown at maturity. In each ascus the upper spore is usually shorter and broader (c. 28.5–39 × 18–22.5 μm) than the lower spore (c. 37.5–45 × 13.5–18 μm); septation typically shows 2–5(–6) transverse and 6–12(–15) longitudinal divisions. Asexual propagules (pycnidia) were not observed in this species. Standard spot tests are negative (K−, C−, KC−, P−), and thin-layer chromatography did not detect any secondary metabolites.

== Habitat and distribution ==
Endocarpon deserticola is known from biological soil crusts on calcareous sands in the Shapotou north experimental zone on the south-eastern fringe of the Tengger Desert (Ningxia Hui Autonomous Region, China), at about 1,340 m elevation. The area is a steppified desert transition with a harsh, dry climate (mean annual precipitation about 180 mm, very high evaporation, frequent winds and dust storm days). Within the crust community E. deserticola helps stabilise loose sand: scanning electron micrographs show its root-like rhizines wrapping sand grains, a mechanism consistent with the recognised role of Endocarpon species in desert soil consolidation. No occurrences are reported outside this region in the describing paper.
