= Endocarpon unifoliatum =

Scientific classification
- Kingdom: Fungi
- Division: Ascomycota
- Class: Eurotiomycetes
- Order: Verrucariales
- Family: Verrucariaceae
- Genus: Endocarpon
- Species: E. unifoliatum

Binomial name
- Endocarpon unifoliatum T.Zhang, X.L.Wei & J.C.Wei (2017)

Species of lichen

Endocarpon unifoliatum is a species of squamulose lichen in the family Verrucariaceae. It was described in 2017 from sandy soil crusts on the south-eastern edge of China's Tengger Desert. The species has a single, concave, lobed scale with slightly upturned margins, and relatively few fruiting bodies. Its branched, root-like rhizines wrap sand grains, helping to stabilise loose desert substrates.

== Taxonomy ==
Endocarpon unifoliatum was described in 2017 by Tao Zhang, Xin-Li Wei and Jiang-Chun Wei based on collections from the Shapotou experimental area in Ningxia, China. The species epithet means 'with one thallus' (Latin unifoliatus). The holotype (collector T. Zhang, Z10020) came from soil crust in the Shapotou north experimental zone and is housed in the lichen collection of the Chinese Academy of Sciences (HMAS-L). In a three-gene molecular analysis (nrITS plus two newly developed protein-coding markers, ADK and UCEH), the species formed a distinct, well-supported lineage within Endocarpon. It resembles Endocarpon pusillum, but that species has a plane, fully adherent thallus with tightly aggregated, nearly inseparable squamules.

== Description ==
Endocarpon unifoliatum is a squamulose lichen with a single, concave, lobed scale (squamule) that is usually solitary rather than forming overlapping patches; squamules are rounded to elongate or irregular and 1–2 (less often up to 4) mm wide. The upper surface is pale to yellowish brown, sometimes greying or whitening towards the centre; the lower surface bears a dark brown to black cortex with black, irregularly branched rhizines about 2–3 mm long that anchor the thallus in sand. Perithecia (flask-shaped, immersed fruiting bodies) are few, typically 0–10 per squamule, and are about 225–300 × 175–250 micrometres (μm). Asci are two-spored; the ascospores are muriform (divided by multiple internal walls), with the upper spore usually shorter and broader than the lower. Typical spore sizes are about 22.5–30 × 13.5–18 μm for the upper spore and 27–34.5 × 12–15 μm for the lower. Asexual propagules (pycnidia) were not seen. Standard spot tests are negative (K−, C−, KC−, P−), and thin-layer chromatography detected no secondary metabolites.

== Habitat and distribution ==
Endocarpon unifoliatum is known from biological soil crusts on calcareous sands in the Shapotou north experimental zone on the south-eastern fringe of the Tengger Desert (Ningxia Hui Autonomous Region, China), at about 1,340 m elevation. The locality has a dry, windy desert-steppe climate (mean annual precipitation about 180 mm, high evaporation, frequent dust storm days). Scanning electron micrographs show E. unifoliatum binding sand particles with its rhizines, consistent with the role of Endocarpon species in desert soil consolidation. The describing paper reports no occurrences outside this area.
