= Owachomo Natural Bridge =

Natural rock arch in Utah, US

Owachomo Bridge
- Rock arch
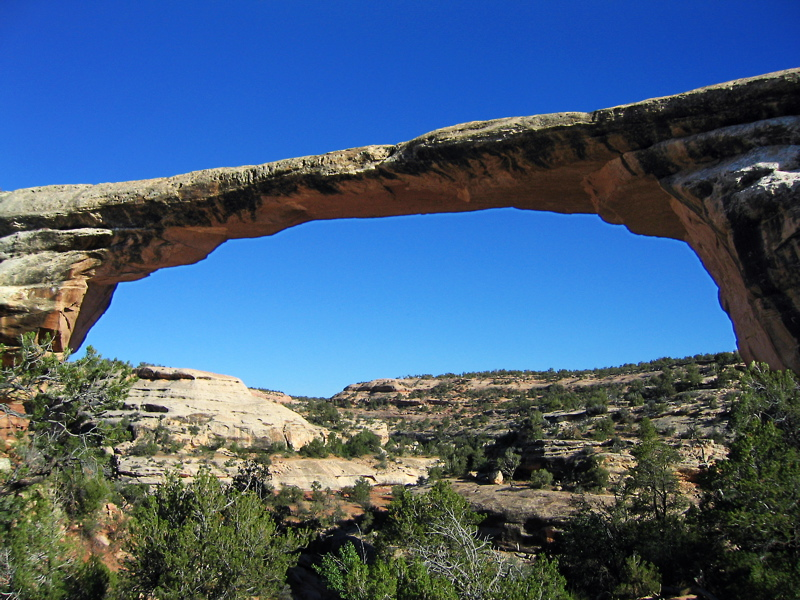
- View of the arch

- Location in Utah Location in Utah
- Coordinates: 37°34′53″N 110°00′54″W
- Location: Natural Bridges National Monument, Utah, United States

Dimensions
  - Length: 180 ft (55 m)
  - Width: 27 ft (8.2 m)
  - Height: 106 ft (32 m)
- Elevation: 5,876 ft (1,791 m)

Owachomo Natural Bridge is a large alcove arch located in Natural Bridges National Monument near Blanding, Utah. It is the oldest and among the longest arches in the region.

== Background ==
The bridge has a width of 27 feet and a span of 180 feet, making it one of the longest natural arch spans in the United States. Owachomo means "rock mound" in Hopi and is named after the rock formation on top of the east end of the bridge. The arch can be reached via the Natural Bridges Owachomo Trail from Bridge View loop drive
