= Kachina Bridge =

Natural rock arch in Utah, US

- Rock arch
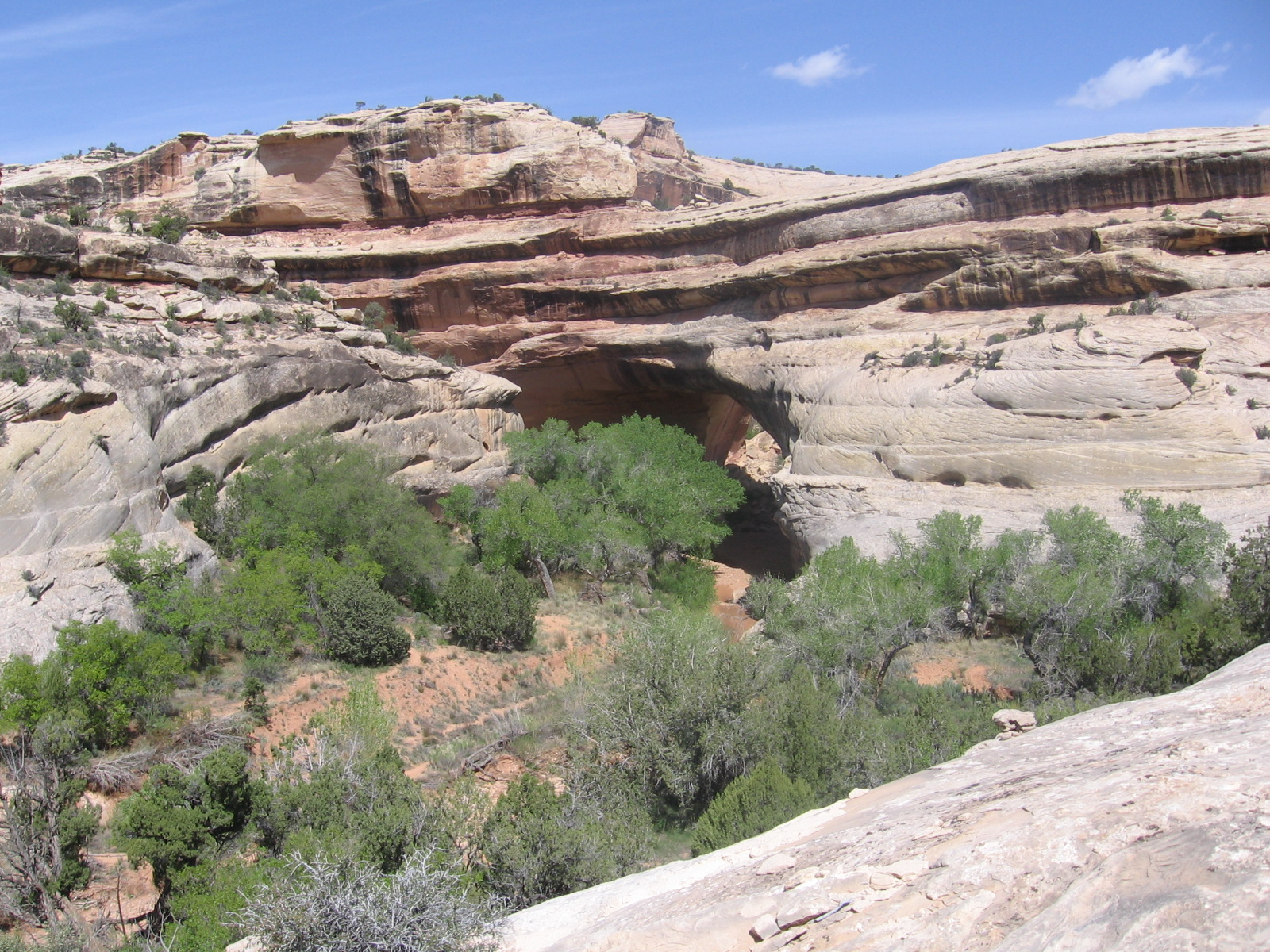
- View of the arch

- Location in Utah Location in Utah
- Coordinates: 37°36′0″N 110°1′51″W
- Location: Natural Bridges National Monument, Utah, United States

Dimensions
  - Length: 210 ft (64 m)
  - Width: 44 ft (13 m)
  - Height: 210 ft (64 m)
- Elevation: 5,781 ft (1,762 m)

Kachina Bridge is a large natural arch located in Natural Bridges National Monument near Blanding, Utah.

== Background ==
The bridge has a width of 44 feet and a span of 210 feet, making it the widest girth in the park and one of the longest natural arches in the United States. It can be reached via a 1.4 mile round trip hike.

== History ==
The area was first settled by early Ancestral Pueblo (Anasazi) cliff dwellers as early as early as 7500 BCE. The current name of the arch was given by government surveyor William Douglas. He based the name off the petroglyphs and pictographs depicted on the base of the bridge, believing that the carved figures represented Kachina dancers. In July 1992, Approximately 4,000 tons of sandstone fell from the inside of the Kachina bridge, enlarging the opening considerably.

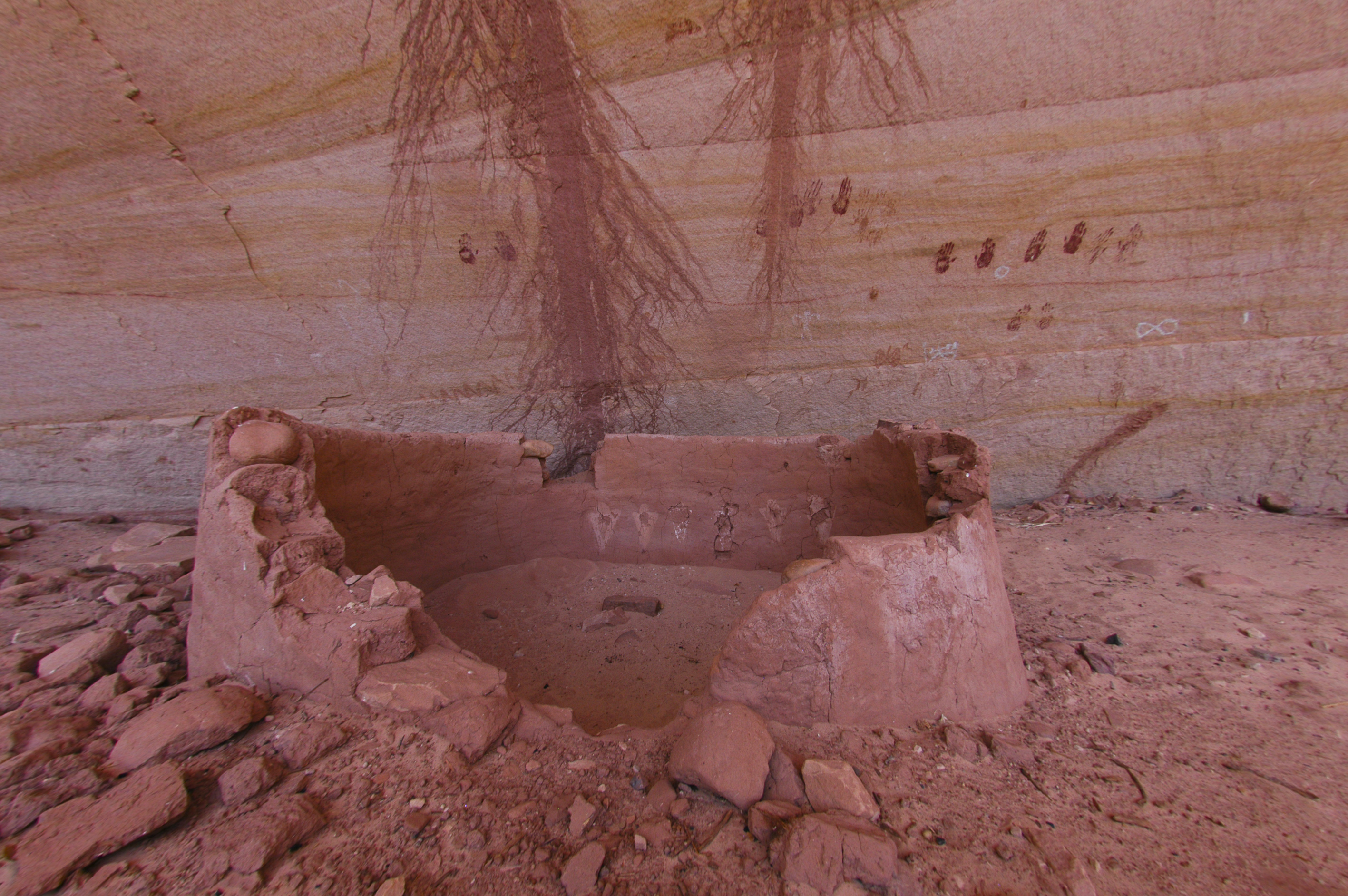
Prehistoric structures and pictographs at Kachina Bridge
