= Natural Bridges National Monument =

National monument in San Juan County, Utah, US

- IUCN category V (protected landscape/seascape)
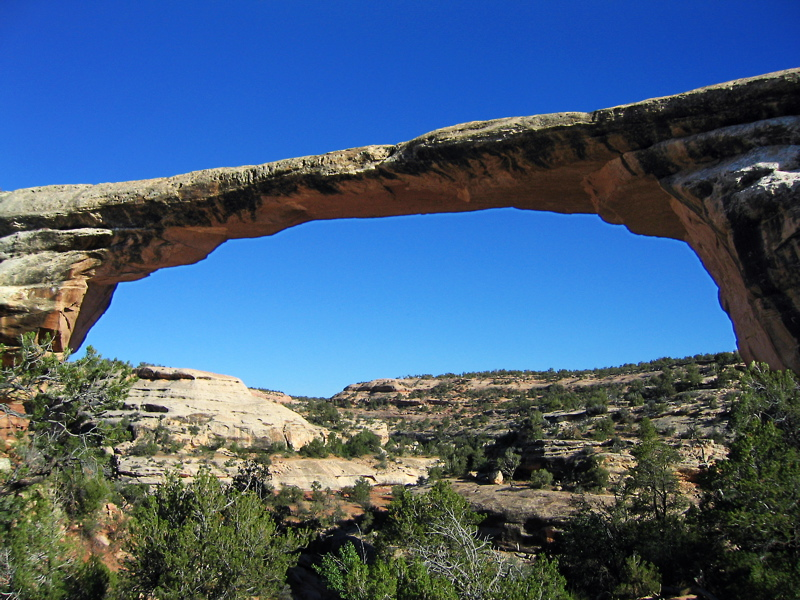
- Owachomo Natural Bridge

- Location within Utah Location within the United States
- Interactive map of Natural Bridges National Monument
- Location: San Juan County, Utah, United States
- Coordinates: 37°36′05″N 110°00′49″W
- Area: 7,636 acres (30.90 km^{2})
- Created: April 16, 1908
- Visitors: 70,400 (in 2025)
- Governing body: National Park Service
- Website: Natural Bridges National Monument

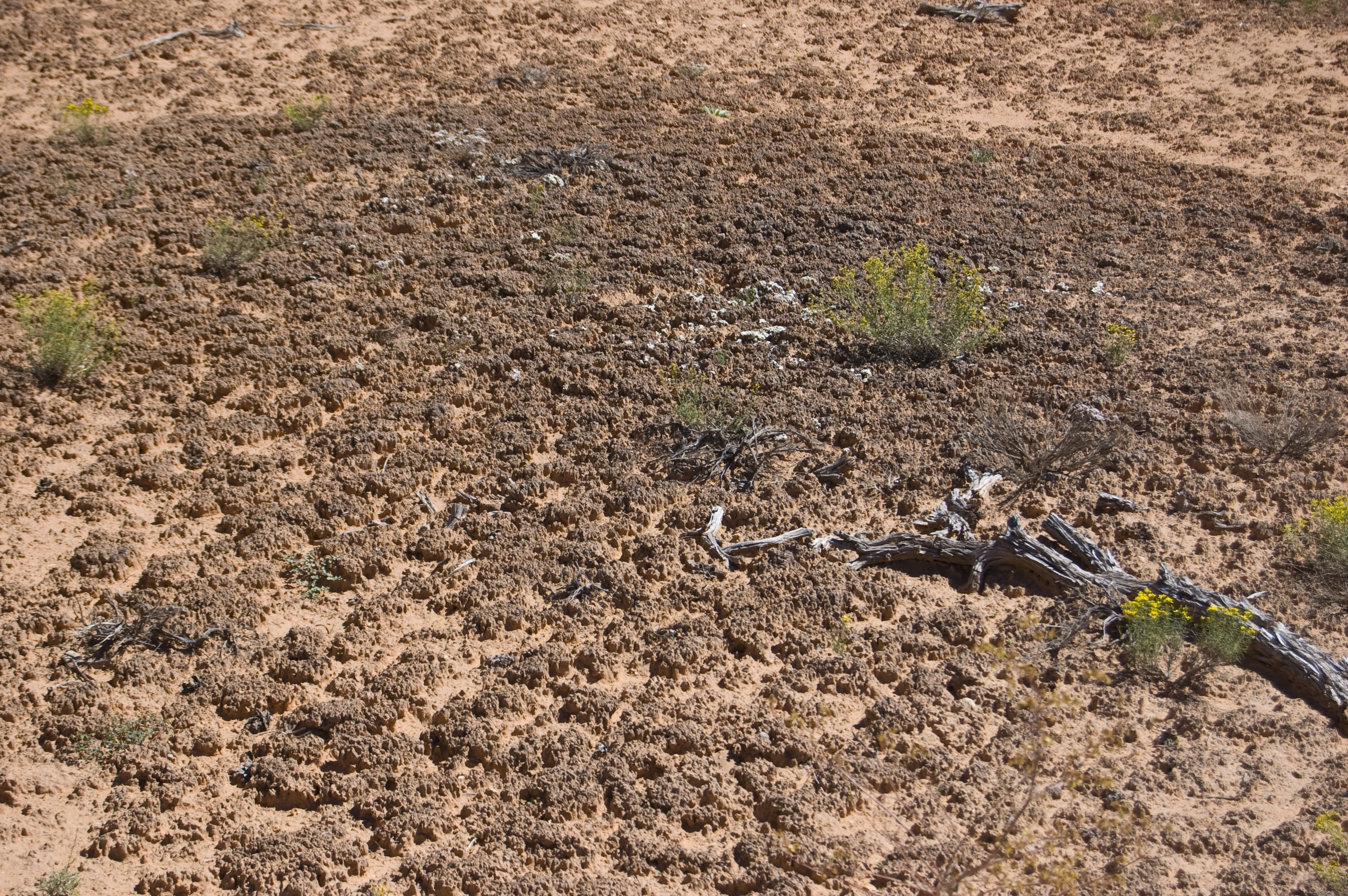
Cryptobiotic soil crust within the park.

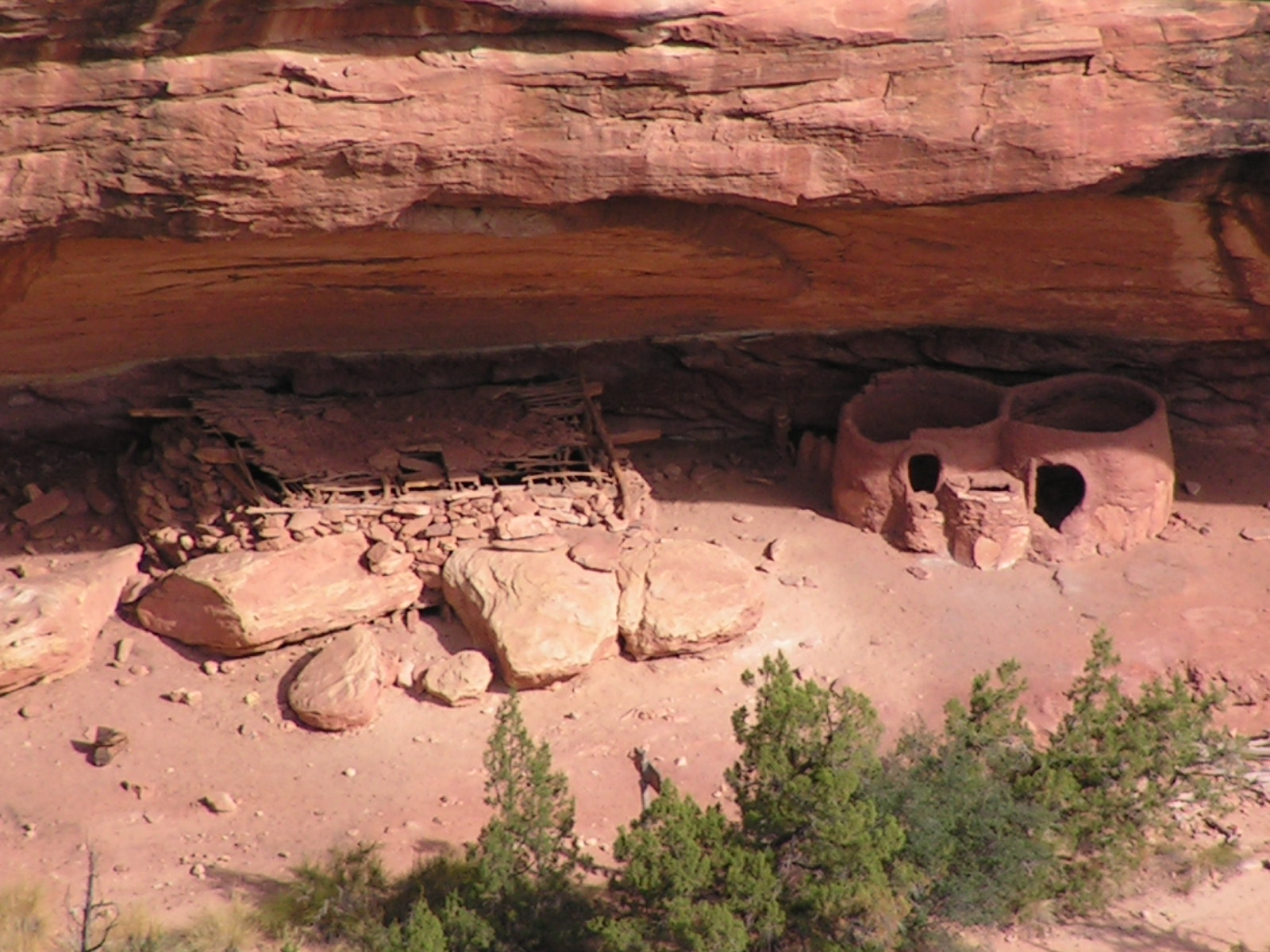
Horsecollar Ruin

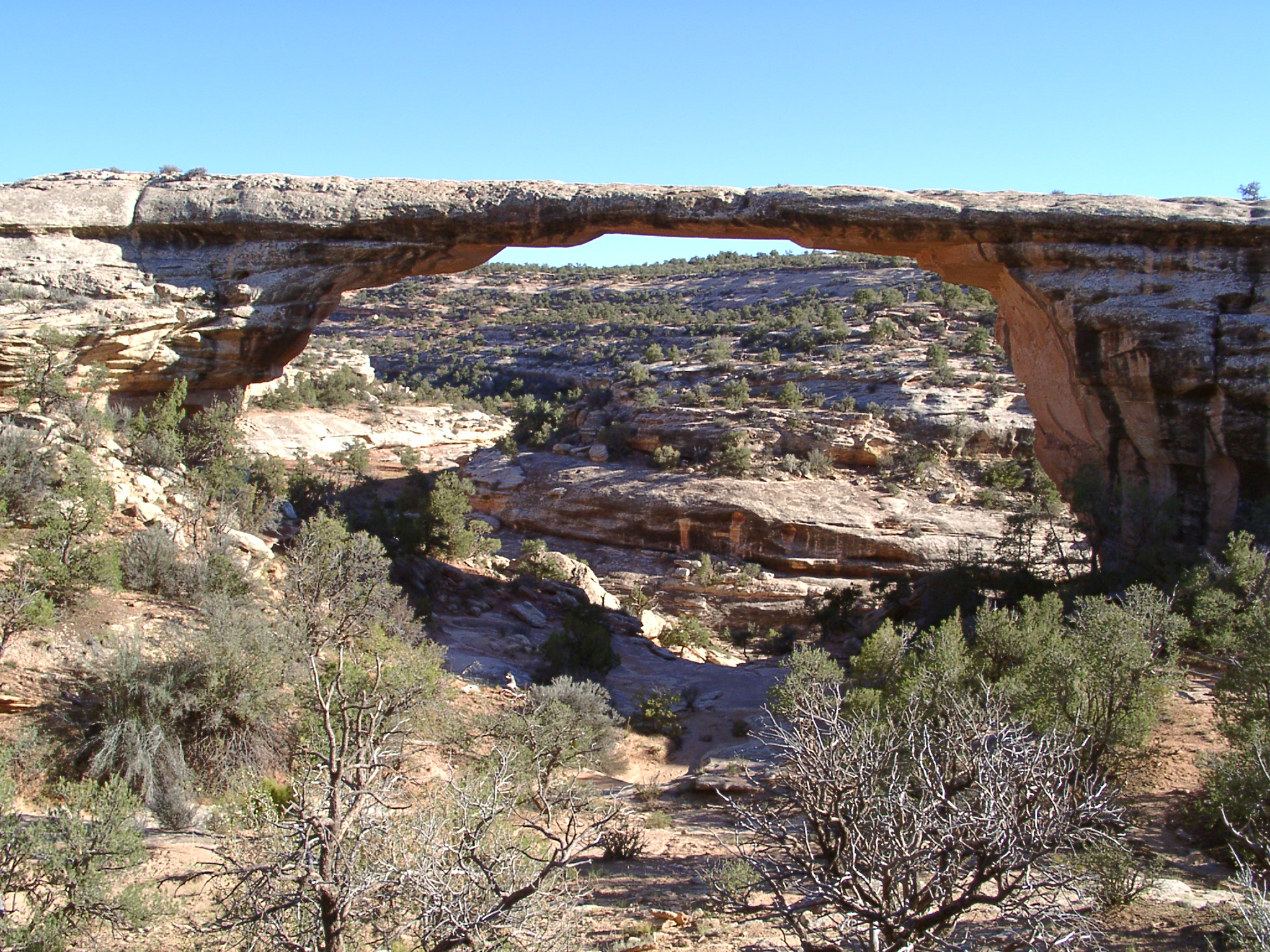
Owachomo Bridge

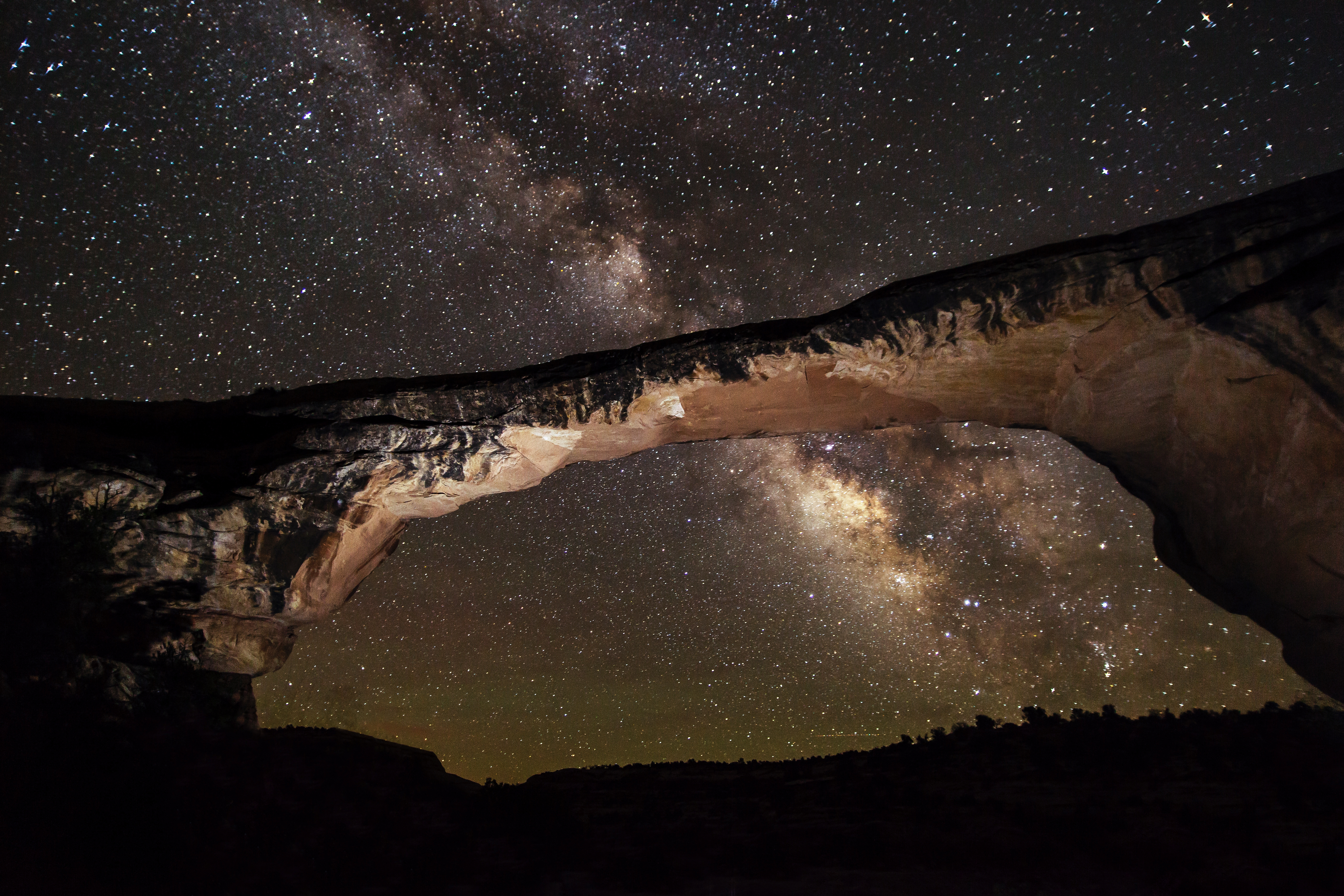
Owachomo Bridge at night

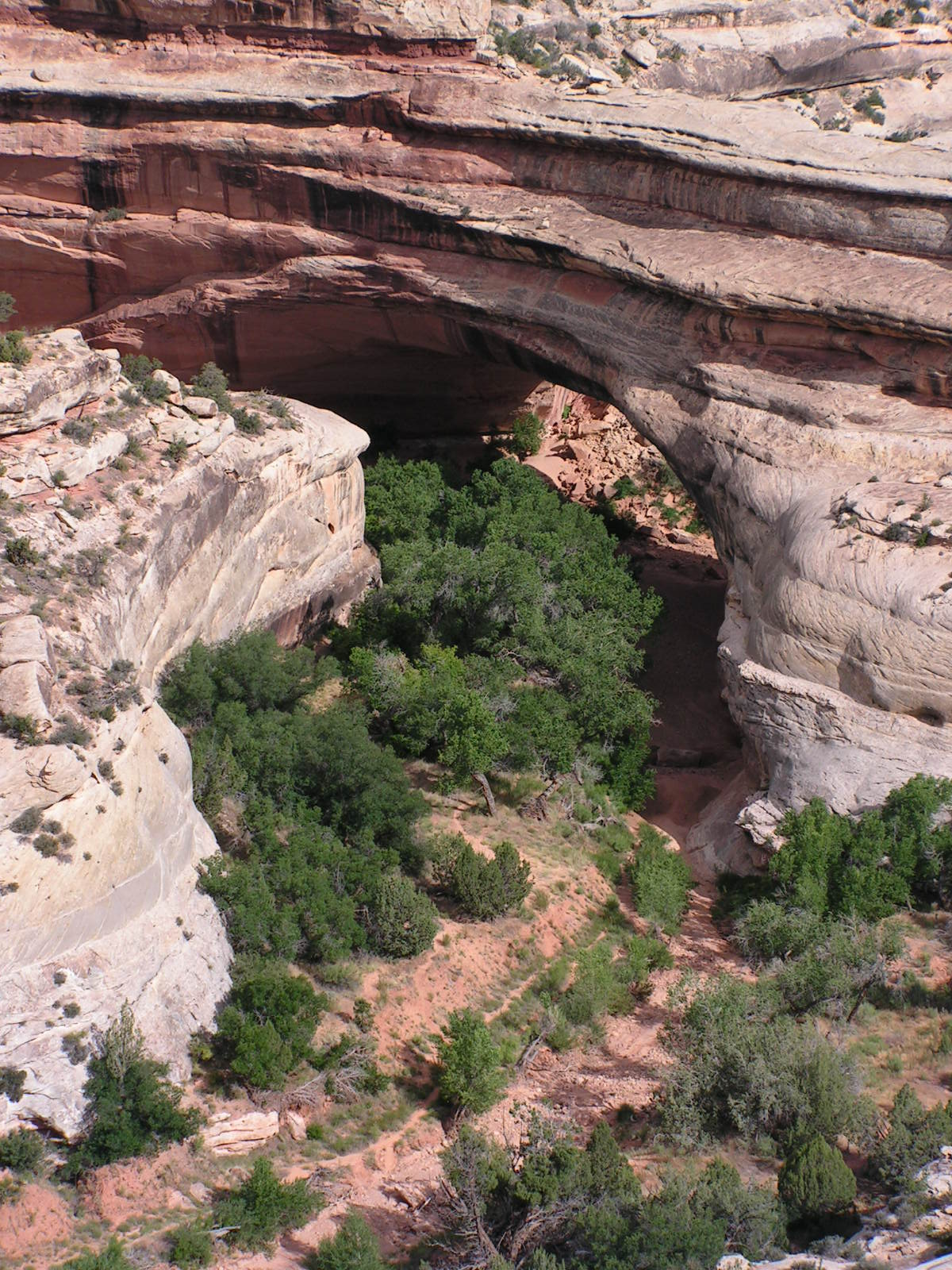
Kachina Bridge

Natural Bridges National Monument is a U.S. National Monument located about 50 miles (80 km) northwest of the Four Corners boundary of southeast Utah, in the western United States, at the junction of White Canyon and Armstrong Canyon, part of the Colorado River drainage. It features the thirteenth largest natural bridge in the world, carved from the white Permian sandstone of the Cedar Mesa Formation that gives White Canyon its name.

The three bridges in the park are named Kachina, Owachomo, and Sipapu (the largest), which are all Hopi names. A natural bridge is formed through erosion by water flowing in the stream bed of the canyon. During periods of flash floods, particularly, the stream undercuts the walls of rock that separate the meanders (or "goosenecks") of the stream until the rock wall within the meander is undercut and the meander is cut off and the new stream bed then flows underneath the bridge. Eventually, as erosion and gravity enlarge the bridge's opening, the bridge collapses under its own weight. There is evidence of at least two collapsed natural bridges within the Monument.

== History ==
Humans have lived in the area around Natural Bridges since as early as 7500 BCE, as shown by rock art and stone tools found at nearby sites. Around 700 CE ancestors of modern Puebloan people moved to the site, constructing stone and mortar buildings and granaries. These structures share similarities with those found in Mesa Verde National Park, which can be seen distantly, to the east, from the Bears Ears on the park's eastern border. Like the people of Mesa Verde, the residents of Natural Bridges seem to have left the region around the year 1270.

Europeans first visited the area in 1883 when gold prospector, Cass Hite followed White Canyon upstream, from the Colorado River, and found the bridges near the junction of White and Armstrong canyons. In 1904, the National Geographic Magazine publicized the bridges and the area was designated a National Monument on April 16, 1908, by President Theodore Roosevelt. It is Utah's first National Monument.

The Monument was nearly inaccessible for many decades as reflected by the visitor log kept by the Monument's superintendents. Reaching the site from Blanding, Utah, the nearest settlement would take a three-day horseback ride. The park received little visitation until after the uranium boom of the 1950s, which resulted in the creation of new roads in the area, including modern-day Utah State Route 95, which was paved in 1976.

== Geology ==
Located within the Colorado Plateau, the monument has three distinct bridges in White and Armstrong Canyons. These canyons were formed when the Colorado River eroded the Permian Cedar Mesa Sandstone. The Sipapu, Kachina, and Owachoma bridges were formed through rock decay, weathering and erosion, as water cut through narrow canyon walls. The monument is also the location of significant Biological soil crust. In places, Desert varnish darkens the lighter White Cedar Mesa Sandstone. The Monument's elevation ranges up to 6,500 feet (2,000 m).

== Attractions ==
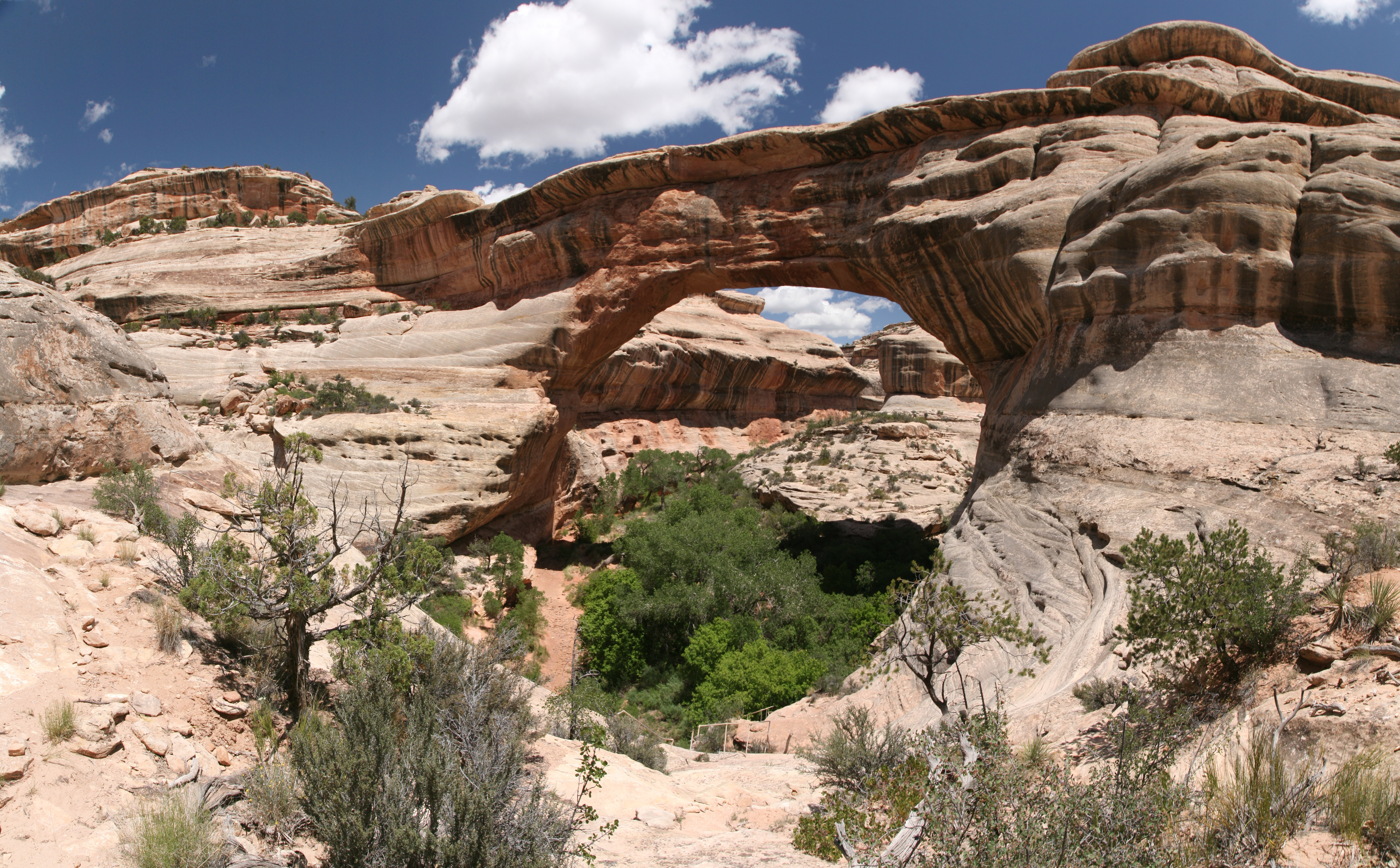
Sipapu Bridge

The main attractions are the natural bridges, accessible from the Bridge View Drive, which winds along the park and goes by all three bridges, and by hiking trails leading down to the bases of the bridges. There is also a campground and picnic areas and a visitor center within the park. Electricity in the park comes entirely from a large solar array near the visitor center.

In 2007, the International Dark-Sky Association named Natural Bridges the first International Dark-Sky Park, which is a designation that recognizes not only that the park has some of the darkest and clearest skies in all of the United States, but also that the park has made every effort to conserve the natural dark as a resource worthy of protection. As of 2007, Natural Bridges has the only night sky monitored by the NPS Night Sky Team that rates a Class 2 on the Bortle Dark-Sky Scale, giving it the darkest sky ever assessed.

Horsecollar Ruin is an Ancestral Puebloan ruin visible from an overlook a short hike from Bridge View Drive. The site was abandoned more than 700 years ago but is in a remarkable state of preservation, including an undisturbed rectangular kiva with the original roof and interior, and two granaries with unusual oval-shaped doors whose shape resembles horse collars (hence the site's name).

Bridge	Height m (ft)	Span m (ft)	Width m (ft)	Thickness m (ft)
Owachomo	32 (106)	55 (180)	8 (27)	3 (9)
Sipapu	67 (220)	68 (225)	9.5 (31)	16 (53)
Kachina	64 (210)	62 (204)	13 (44)	28 (93)

== Biology ==
Animal species found in the National Monument include birds such as the pinyon jay, canyon wren, and wild turkey (which were reintroduced by the State of Utah to the table-lands above the Monument) and mammals like rabbits, pack rats, bobcats, coyotes, bears, mule deer, and mountain lion. The Monument's pygmy rattlesnakes have been the subject of occasional study; several lizard species common to southern Utah are abundant. In May 2006, KSL Newsradio reported a case of plague found in dead field mice and chipmunks at Natural Bridges.

Native plant species include willow, cottonwood, Douglas fir, ponderosa pine, pinyon pine, juniper, grasses, annuals, and perennials such as asters, penstemons, buckwheats, and Indian paintbrush, and various shrubs such as dwarf oaks, bayberry, manzanita, buffaloberry, rabbitbrush, black brush, brittle brush, Apache's plume, sage, yucca, and Mormon tea. Invasive species include tumbleweeds, certain thistles, dandelions, and tamarisk.

Much of the Monument's ground is covered in communities of cryptobiotic soil crusts, which prevents soil erosion and promotes the retention of soil nutrients.

== Climate ==
Natural Bridges National Monument has a cold semi-arid climate (Köppen: BSk) with cold winters and hot summers.

Climate data for Natural Bridges National Monument, Utah, 1991–2020 normals, extremes 1965–present
Month	Jan	Feb	Mar	Apr	May	Jun	Jul	Aug	Sep	Oct	Nov	Dec	Year
Record high °F (°C)	60 (16)	68 (20)	82 (28)	85 (29)	93 (34)	101 (38)	103 (39)	99 (37)	96 (36)	87 (31)	78 (26)	61 (16)	103 (39)
Mean maximum °F (°C)	50.6 (10.3)	55.5 (13.1)	66.9 (19.4)	75.3 (24.1)	84.7 (29.3)	93.0 (33.9)	96.5 (35.8)	92.8 (33.8)	88.2 (31.2)	78.6 (25.9)	63.2 (17.3)	52.3 (11.3)	96.8 (36.0)
Mean daily maximum °F (°C)	39.3 (4.1)	43.4 (6.3)	52.8 (11.6)	60.5 (15.8)	71.0 (21.7)	83.2 (28.4)	88.6 (31.4)	85.2 (29.6)	77.1 (25.1)	63.4 (17.4)	50.2 (10.1)	39.4 (4.1)	62.8 (17.1)
Daily mean °F (°C)	29.5 (−1.4)	33.5 (0.8)	41.4 (5.2)	47.7 (8.7)	57.5 (14.2)	68.4 (20.2)	74.3 (23.5)	71.8 (22.1)	64.1 (17.8)	51.2 (10.7)	39.5 (4.2)	29.8 (−1.2)	50.7 (10.4)
Mean daily minimum °F (°C)	19.8 (−6.8)	23.5 (−4.7)	29.9 (−1.2)	35.0 (1.7)	44.0 (6.7)	53.7 (12.1)	60.1 (15.6)	58.5 (14.7)	51.1 (10.6)	38.9 (3.8)	28.8 (−1.8)	20.1 (−6.6)	38.6 (3.7)
Mean minimum °F (°C)	5.1 (−14.9)	10.0 (−12.2)	17.1 (−8.3)	22.0 (−5.6)	30.5 (−0.8)	40.1 (4.5)	51.3 (10.7)	50.2 (10.1)	37.6 (3.1)	24.0 (−4.4)	12.9 (−10.6)	5.4 (−14.8)	2.6 (−16.3)
Record low °F (°C)	−11 (−24)	−13 (−25)	6 (−14)	6 (−14)	20 (−7)	30 (−1)	41 (5)	37 (3)	27 (−3)	6 (−14)	−2 (−19)	−14 (−26)	−14 (−26)
Average precipitation inches (mm)	1.20 (30)	0.83 (21)	0.90 (23)	0.72 (18)	0.86 (22)	0.38 (9.7)	1.20 (30)	1.42 (36)	1.61 (41)	1.15 (29)	0.66 (17)	1.05 (27)	11.98 (304)
Average snowfall inches (cm)	10.8 (27)	5.5 (14)	3.3 (8.4)	1.6 (4.1)	0.2 (0.51)	0.0 (0.0)	0.0 (0.0)	0.0 (0.0)	0.0 (0.0)	0.6 (1.5)	2.4 (6.1)	7.6 (19)	32.0 (81)
Average precipitation days (≥ 0.01 in)	5.6	5.8	5.3	4.4	4.8	2.0	7.9	8.0	6.2	5.2	3.9	5.4	64.5
Average snowy days (≥ 0.1 in)	4.3	3.1	1.9	0.8	0.1	0.0	0.0	0.0	0.0	0.4	1.6	4.2	16.4
Source: NOAA

== See also ==
- List of national monuments of the United States
- Arches National Park
- Dark Canyon Wilderness
- Glen Canyon National Recreation Area
- Manti-La Sal National Forest
- Muley Point
- Rainbow Bridge National Monument
- Bears Ears National Monument
- Hite, Utah
