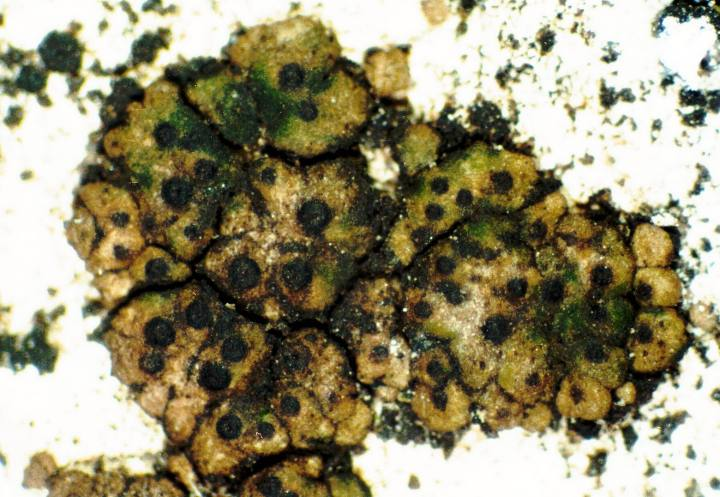
- Endocarpon petrolepideum

Scientific classification
- Kingdom: Fungi
- Division: Ascomycota
- Class: Eurotiomycetes
- Order: Verrucariales
- Family: Verrucariaceae
- Genus: Endocarpon; Hedw. (1789)

Type species
- Endocarpon pusillum Hedw. (1789)

Species
- See text

Synonyms
- List: Endopyreniomyces E.A.Thomas (1939); Leightonia Trevis. (1853); Paracarpidium Müll.Arg. (1883); Phalostauris Clem. (1909); Pyrenothamnia Tuck. (1883); Pyrenothamniomyces Cif. & Tomas. (1953); Rhodocarpon Lönnr. (1858)

= Endocarpon =

Genus of lichens

Endocarpon is a genus of saxicolous (rock-dwelling), squamulose lichens in the family Verrucariaceae. It comprises 23 species. The genus is characterised by its enclosed fruiting bodies (perithecia) embedded within the scales and its compartmentalised spores. Species in this genus typically grow on rocks, often in areas that experience periodic moisture.

== Taxonomy ==
The German bryologist Johann Hedwig introduced the genus Endocarpon in 1789 for a minute, terrestrial lichen he called Endocarpon pusillum, providing a Latin diagnosis and an illustrated plate. He described a flat, very small thallus, deep green and finely black-dotted, becoming paler from above, with very delicate, simple root-like attachments. The analytic notes and key to the plate emphasise internal reproductive bodies: clavate, very thin-walled asci embedded in the thallus and without paraphyses, each containing two oval spores that are pale and only slightly brownish. The explanation to the plate includes a perpendicular section of the thallus to show the enclosed ascus, together with details of isolated asci and released spores. Hedwig recorded the species as a soil-growing lichen, found on earthen clods and observed around Leipzig. In a brief remark he compared the plants "fructification" with that of the liverwort genus Riccia.

== Description ==
Lichens in the genus Endocarpon have a squamulose thallus, meaning their body is made up of small, scale-like lobes. These lobes typically lie flat against the surface they grow on but can sometimes be slightly raised. In rare cases, the thallus may take on a more leaf-like (subfoliose) form. The outer layer of the lichen, the cortex, is composed of roughly spherical cells. Beneath this, the inner tissue (medulla) may contain similar cells or more elongated ones. Unlike some lichens, Endocarpon species often lack a distinct lower cortex, though they may have a loosely arranged layer of rounded or angular cells. Many species produce rhizines—small, root-like structures that help anchor the lichen to its substrate.

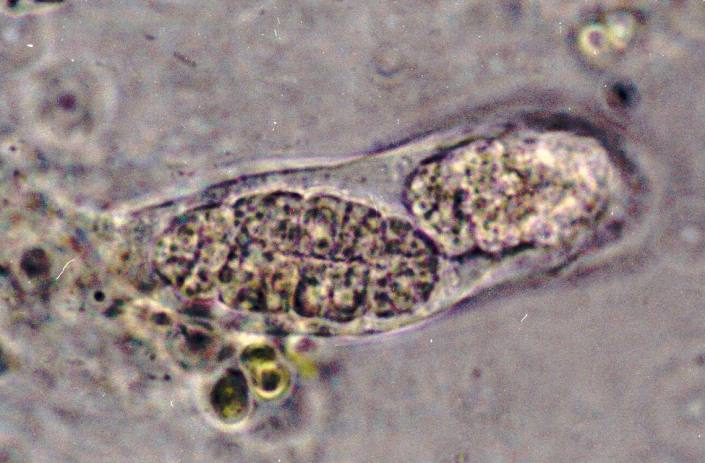
Two muriform spores in an ascus from E. petrolepideum; x1000 magnification

The lichen's photosynthetic partner is Diplosphaera, a type of green alga in the Trebouxiophyceae. This alga is found not only within the thallus but also within the reproductive structures, often forming column-like arrangements inside the lichen's body.

Endocarpon lichens reproduce through small, rounded fruiting bodies called perithecia, which are embedded within the thallus. These structures have a tiny pore (ostiole) at the top, which allows spores to be released. The outer layer of the perithecia (exciple) is dark in colour throughout, and unlike some related lichens, Endocarpon lacks an outer protective layer called an involucrellum. Inside, the spore-producing tissue (hymenium) reacts with iodine-based stains, turning reddish or bluish with iodine (I+) and blue with potassium iodide (K/I+). Unlike many lichens, the reproductive structures do not contain paraphyses (sterile filaments), but they do have numerous periphyses—small hair-like structures lining the opening of the perithecia.

The spores of Endocarpon are typically produced in groups of one or two per ascus (though occasionally up to four). They are enclosed in a thick-walled, sac-like structure (ascus) that splits open to release them. The spores themselves are muriform, meaning they are divided into multiple compartments by internal walls (septa), and they can be colourless, yellowish-brown, or dark brown. In addition to sexual reproduction, Endocarpon can also produce asexual spores (conidia) within specialised structures called pycnidia, which are also embedded in the thallus. These conidia are tiny, rod-shaped, colourless, and lack internal divisions. Chemically, Endocarpon does not produce any secondary metabolites detectable through thin-layer chromatography.

== Species ==
As of February 2025, Species Fungorum (in the Catalogue of Life) accept 23 species of Endocarpon.

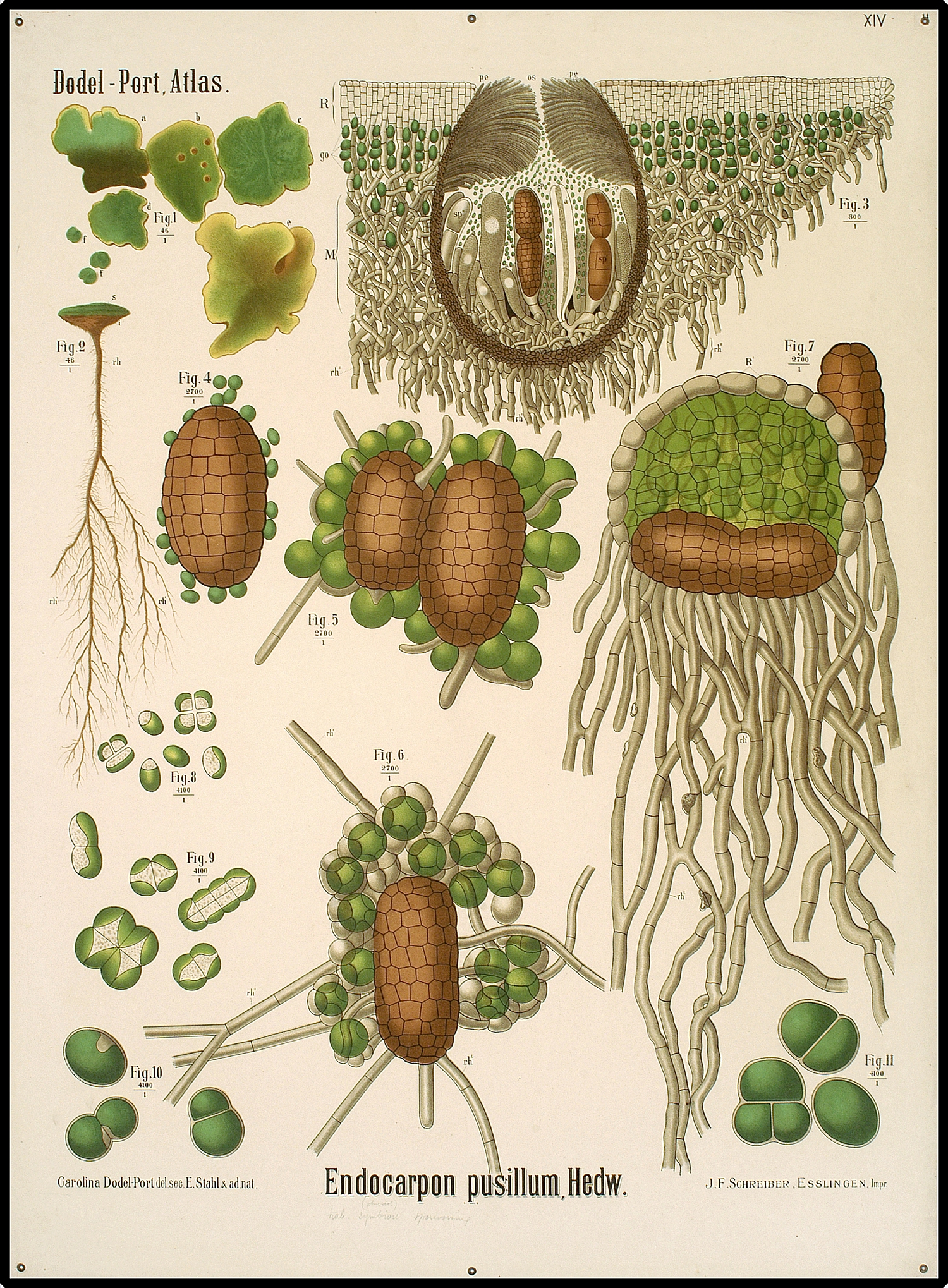
Endocarpon pusillum

- Endocarpon adscendens (Anzi) Müll.Arg. (1881)
- Endocarpon aridum P.M.McCarthy (1991) – Australia
- Endocarpon baicalense Makryĭ (2008)
- Endocarpon crassisporum P.M.McCarthy & Filson (1991) – Australia
- Endocarpon crystallinum J.C.Wei & Jun Yang (2009) – China
- Endocarpon deserticola T.Zhang, X.L.Wei & J.C.Wei (2017) – China
- Endocarpon helmsianum Müll.Arg. (1892)
- Endocarpon macrosporum P.M.McCarthy (1991) – Australia
- Endocarpon maritimum Y.Joshi & Hur (2013) – South Korea
- Endocarpon muelleri M.Choisy (1954)
- Endocarpon myeloxanthum Breuss (2000) – Mexico
- Endocarpon pallidulum (Nyl.) Nyl. (1892)
- Endocarpon pallidum Ach. (1810)
- Endocarpon pseudosubnitescens Breuss (2002) – Mexico
- Endocarpon pusillum Hedw. (1789)
- Endocarpon riparium Aptroot & M.Cáceres (2016) – Brazil
- Endocarpon robustum P.M.McCarthy (1991) – Australia
- Endocarpon rogersii P.M.McCarthy (1991) – Australia
- Endocarpon simplicatum (Nyl.) Nyl. (1888)
- Endocarpon subramulosum Y.Joshi & Hur (2013) – South Korea
- Endocarpon tenuissimum (Degel.) Lendemer & E.A.Tripp (2013)
- Endocarpon unifoliatum T.Zhang, X.L.Wei & J.C.Wei (2017) – China
- Endocarpon zschackei M.Choisy (1954)
