= Biological soil crust =

Communities of living organisms on the soil surface in arid and semi-arid ecosystems

- Cryptobiotic soil, cryptogamic soil, microbiotic soil, microphytic soil, biocrust
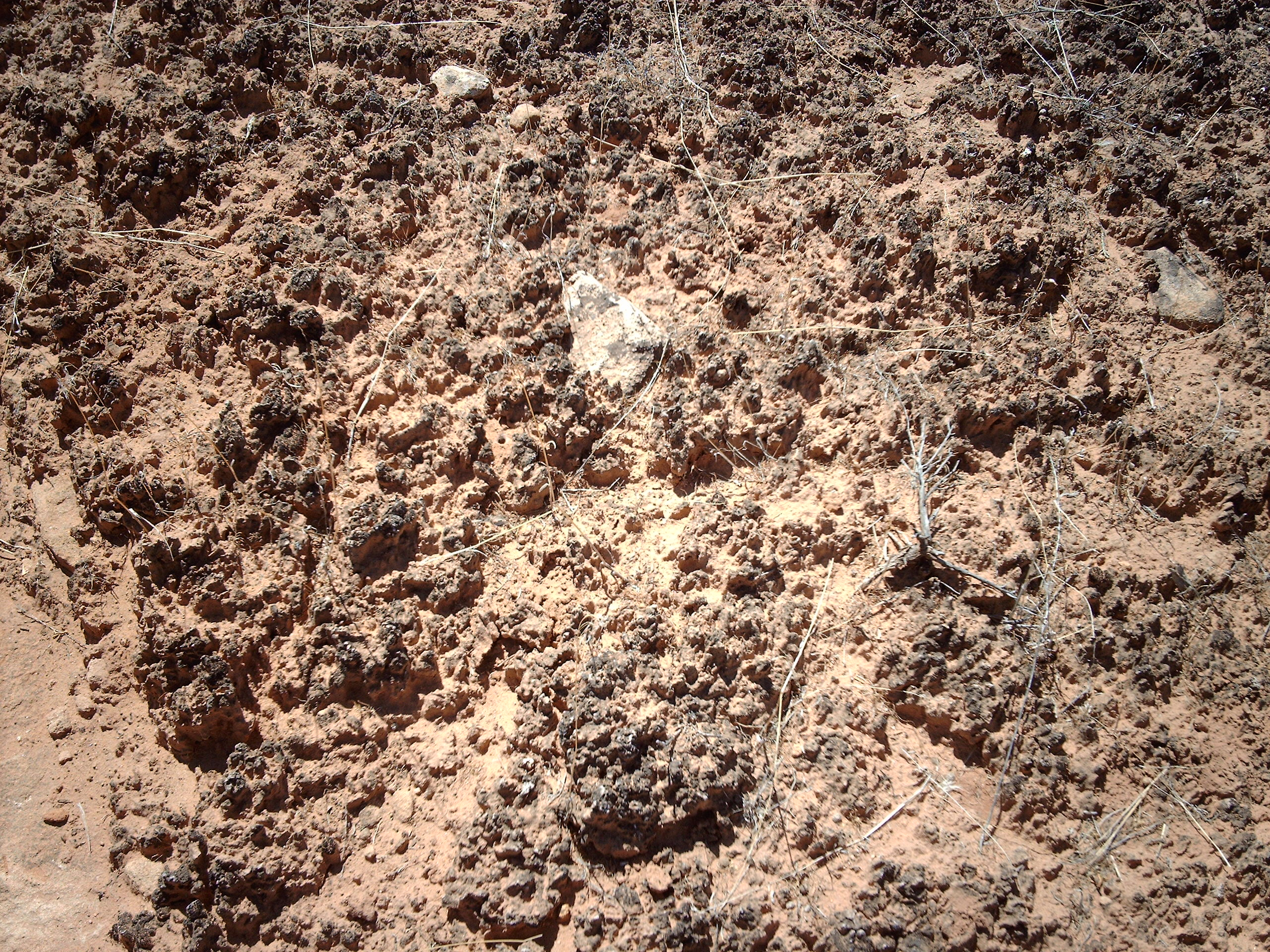
- Biological soil crust in Hovenweep National Monument.
- Climate: arid, semi-arid
- Primary: fungi, lichens, cyanobacteria, bryophytes, and algae

Biological soil crusts, often abbreviated as biocrusts, are communities of living organisms inhabiting the surface of soils in arid and semi-arid ecosystems, which form stable aggregates of soil particles in a thin layer millimeters to centimeters thick. They are found throughout the world with varying species composition and cover depending on topography, soil characteristics, climate, plant community, microhabitats, and disturbance regimes. An estimated 12% of Earth's terrestrial surface is covered by biocrusts.

Biological soil crusts perform important ecological roles including carbon fixation, nitrogen fixation and soil stabilization; they alter soil albedo and water relations and affect germination and nutrient levels in vascular plants. They can be damaged by fire, recreational activity, grazing and other disturbances and can require long time periods to recover composition and function. Other names for biological soil crusts include cryptogamic, microbiotic, microphytic, or cryptobiotic soils.

== Natural history ==
=== Biology and composition ===
Biological soil crusts are most often composed of fungi, lichens, cyanobacteria, bryophytes, and algae in varying proportions. These organisms live in intimate association in the uppermost few millimeters of the soil surface, and are the biological basis for the formation of soil crusts.

==== Cyanobacteria ====
Cyanobacteria are the main photosynthetic component of biological soil crusts, in addition to other photosynthetic taxa such as mosses, lichens, and green algae. The most common cyanobacteria found in soil crusts belong to large filamentous species such as those in the genus Microcoleus. These species form bundled filaments that are surrounded by a gelatinous sheath of polysaccharides. These filaments bind soil particles throughout the uppermost soil layers, forming a 3-D net-like structure that holds the soil together in a crust. Other common cyanobacteria species are as those in the genus Nostoc, which can also form sheaths and sheets of filaments that stabilize the soil. Some Nostoc species are also able to fix atmospheric nitrogen gas into bio-available forms such as ammonia.

==== Bryophytes ====
Bryophytes in soil crusts include mosses and liverworts. Mosses are usually classified as short annual mosses or tall perennial mosses. Liverworts can be flat and ribbon-like or leafy. They can reproduce by spore formation or by asexual fragmentation, and photosynthesize to fix carbon from the atmosphere.

About 250 moss species have been recorded in biocrust communities, mostly from the families Bryaceae, Pottiaceae, and Grimmiaceae.

==== Lichens ====
Lichens are often distinguished by growth form and by their photosymbiont. Crust lichens include crustose and areolate lichens that are appressed to the soil substrate, squamulose lichens with scale- or plate-like bodies that are raised above the soils, and foliose lichens with more "leafy" structures that can be attached to the soil at only one portion. Lichens with algal symbionts can fix atmospheric carbon, while lichens with cyanobacterial symbionts can fix nitrogen as well. Lichens produce many pigments that help protect them from radiation.

==== Fungi ====
Microfungi in biological soil crusts can occur as free-living species, or in symbiosis with algae in lichens. Free-living microfungi often function as decomposers, and contribute to soil microbial biomass. Many microfungi in biological soil crusts have adapted to the intense light conditions by evolving the ability to produce melanin, and are called black fungi or black yeasts. Fungal hyphae can bind soil particles together.

==== Free-living green algae ====
Green algae in soil crusts are present just below the soil surface where they are partially protected from UV radiation. They become inactive when dry and reactivate when moistened. They can photosynthesize to fix carbon from the atmosphere.

=== Formation and succession ===
Biological soil crusts are formed in open spaces between vascular plants. Frequently, single-celled organisms such as cyanobacteria or spores of free-living fungi colonize bare ground first. Once filaments have stabilized the soil, lichens and mosses can colonize. Appressed lichens are generally earlier colonizers or persist in more stressful conditions, while more three-dimensional lichens require long disturbance-free growth periods and more moderate conditions.

Recovery following disturbance varies. Cyanobacteria cover can recover by propagules blowing in from adjacent undisturbed areas rapidly after disturbance. Total recovery of cover and composition occurs more rapidly in fine soil textured, moister environments (~2 years) and more slowly (>3800 years) in coarse soil textured, dry environments. Recovery times also depend on disturbance regime, site, and availability of propagules.

== Distribution ==
=== Geographical range ===
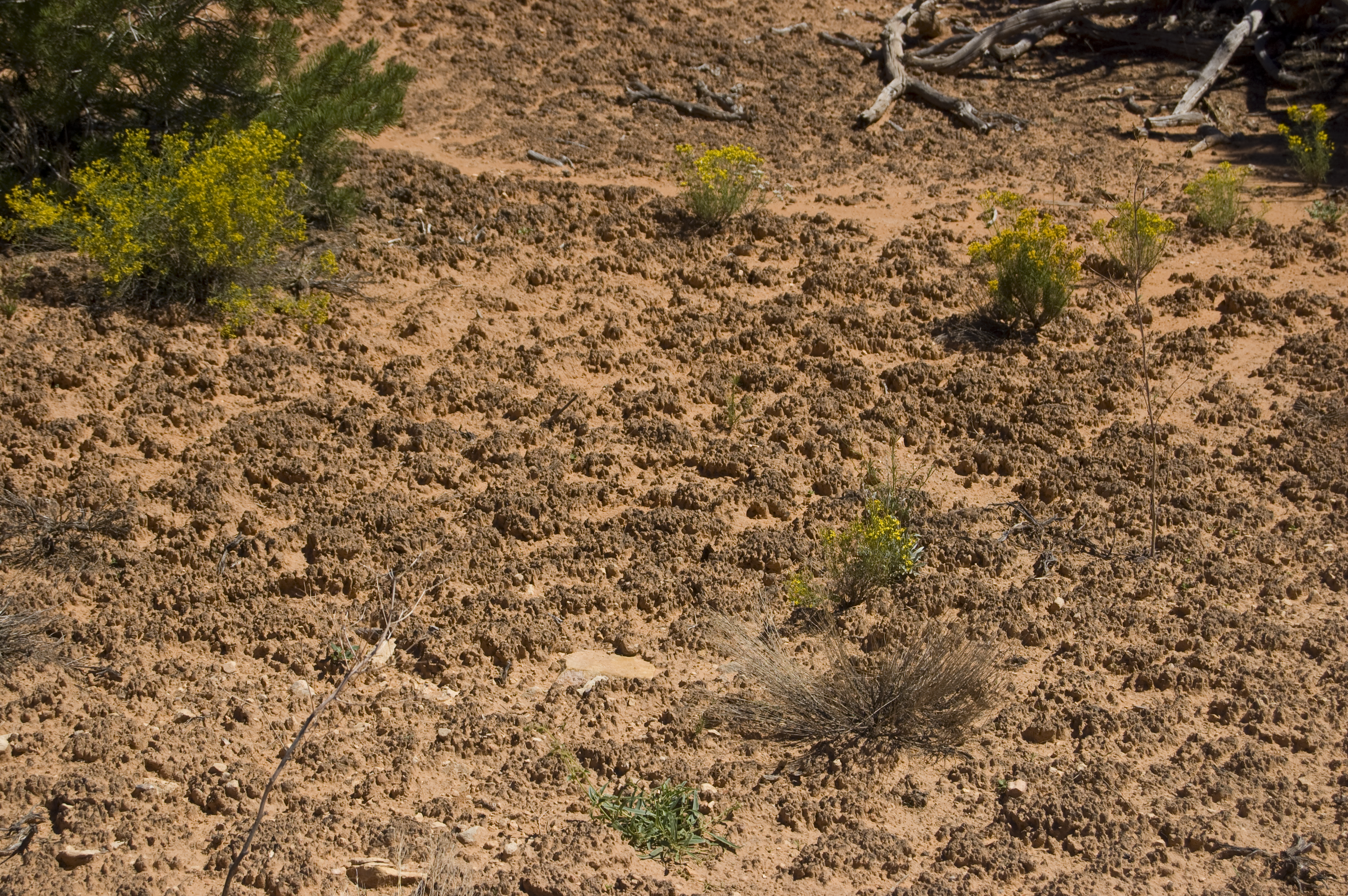
Biological soil crust in Natural Bridges National Monument near Sipapu Bridge.

Biological soil crusts cover about 12% of the earth's landmass. They are found on almost all soil types, but are more commonly found in arid regions of the world where plant cover is low and plants are more widely spaced. This is because crust organisms have a limited ability to grow upwards and cannot compete for light with vascular plants. Across the globe, biological soil crusts can be found on all continents including Antarctica.

=== Variation throughout range ===
The species composition and physical appearance of biological soil crusts vary depending on the climate, soil, and disturbance conditions. For example, biological soil crusts are more dominated by green algae on more acidic and less salty soils, whereas cyanobacteria are more favored on alkaline and haline soils. Within a climate zone, the abundance of lichens and mosses in biological soil crusts generally increases with increasing clay and silt content and decreasing sand. Also, habitats that are more moist generally support more lichens and mosses.

The morphology of biological soil crust surfaces can range from smooth and a few millimeters in thickness to pinnacles up to 15 cm high. Smooth biological soil crusts occur in hot deserts where the soil does not freeze, and consist mostly of cyanobacteria, algae, and fungi. Thicker and rougher crusts occur in areas where higher precipitation results in increased cover of lichen and mosses, and frost heaving of these surfaces cause microtopography such as rolling hills and steep pinnacles. Due to the intense UV radiation present in areas where biological soil crusts occur, biological soil crusts can appear darker than the crustless soil in the same area due to the UV-protective pigmentation of cyanobacteria and other crust organisms.

== Ecology ==
=== Ecosystem function and services ===
==== Biogeochemical cycling ====
===== Carbon cycling =====
Biological soil crusts contribute to the carbon cycle through respiration and photosynthesis of crust microorganisms which are active only when wet. Respiration can begin in as little as 3 minutes after wetting whereas photosynthesis reaches full activity after 30 minutes. Some groups have different responses to high water content, with some lichens showing decreased photosynthesis when water content was greater than 60% whereas green algae showed little response to high water content. Photosynthesis rates are also dependent on temperature, with rates increasing up to approximately 28 °C (82 °F). Carbon dioxide uptake rates increase with ambient carbon dioxide up to at least 1000 ppm under field and laboratory experimental conditions.

Estimates for annual carbon inputs range from 0.4 to 37 g/cm*year depending on successional state. Estimates of total net carbon uptake by crusts globally are ~3.9 Pg/year (2.1–7.4 Pg/year).

===== Nitrogen cycling =====
Biological soil crust contributions to the nitrogen cycle varies by crust composition because only cyanobacteria and cyanolichens fix nitrogen. Nitrogen fixation requires energy from photosynthesis products, and thus increase with temperature given sufficient moisture. Nitrogen fixed by crusts has been shown to leak into surrounding substrate and can be taken up by plants, bacteria, and fungi. Nitrogen fixation has been recorded at rates of 0.7–100 kg/ha per year, from hot deserts in Australia to cold deserts. Estimates of total biological nitrogen fixation are ~ 49 Tg/year (27–99 Tg/year).

==== Geophysical and geomorphological properties ====
===== Soil stability =====
Soils in arid regions are slow-forming and easily eroded. Crust organisms contribute to increased soil stability where they occur. Cyanobacteria have filamentous growth forms that bind soil particles together, and hyphae of fungi and rhizines/rhizoids of lichens and mosses also have similar effects. The increased surface roughness of crusted areas compared to bare soil further improves resistance to wind and water erosion. Aggregates of soil formed by crust organisms also increase soil aeration and provide surfaces where nutrient transformation can occur.

===== Soil water relations =====
The effect of biological soil crusts on water infiltration and soil moisture depends on the dominant crust organisms, soil characteristics, and climate. In areas where biological soil crusts produce rough surface microtopography, water is detained longer on the soil surface and this increases water infiltration. However, in warm deserts where biological soil crusts are smooth and flat, infiltration rates can be decreased by bioclogging.

===== Albedo =====
The darkened surfaces of biological soil crusts decreases soil albedo (a measure of the amount of light reflected off of the surface) compared to nearby soils, which increases the energy absorbed by the soil surface. Soils with well-developed biological soil crusts can be over 12 °C (22 °F) warmer than adjacent surfaces. Increased soil temperatures are associated with increased metabolic processes such as photosynthesis and nitrogen fixation, as well as higher soil water evaporation rates and delayed seedling germination and establishment. The activity levels of many arthropods and small mammals are also controlled by soil surface temperature.

===== Dust-trapping =====
The increased surface roughness associated with biological soil crusts increase the capture of dust. These Aeolian deposits of dust are often enriched in plant-essential nutrients, and thus increase both the fertility and the water holding capacity of soils.

===== Hydration and dehydration cycles =====
The biological soil crust is an integral part of many arid and semi-arid ecosystems as an essential contributor to conditions such as dust control, water acquisition, and contributors of soil nutrients. Biocrust is poikilohydric and does not have the ability to maintain or regulate its own water retention. This causes the biocrust's water content to change depending on the water in the surrounding environment. Due to biological soil crust existing in mostly arid and semi-arid environments with the inability to hold water, the crust is mainly dormant except for short periods of activity when the crust receives precipitation. Microorganisms like those that make up biological soil crust are good at responding quickly to changes in the environment even after a period of dormancy such as precipitation.

Desiccation can lead to oxidation and the destruction of nutrients, amino acids, and cell membranes in the microorganisms that make up biological soil crust. However, the biological soil crust has adapted to survive in very harsh environments with the aid of cyanobacteria. Cyanobacteria have evolved the ability to navigate the extreme conditions of their surrounding environment by existing in a biocrust. A trait of the biological soil crust community is that it will activate from a dormant state when it is exposed to precipitation transforming from a dry, dead-looking crust to an actively photosynthetic community. It will change its appearance to be vibrant and alive to the naked eye. Many crusts will even turn different shades of dark green. The cyanobacterium Microcoleus vaginatus is one of the most dominant organisms found in biocrust and is fundamental to the crust's ability to reawaken from dormancy when rehydrated due to precipitation or runoff. Cyanobacteria have been found to outcompete the other components of biocrust when exposed to light and precipitation. Cyanobacteria are primarily responsible for the pigment and rejuvenation of the crust during environmental changes that result in short spurts of rehydration for the biocrust.

A filamentous cyanobacterium called Microcoleus vaginatus was found to exist in a dormant, metabolically inactive state beneath the surface of the crust in periods of drought or water deficiency. When the biocrust eventually receives precipitation, it is able to perform hydrotaxis and appears to resurrect. In this stage, the M. vaginatus migrates upward to the surface of the crust when hydrated, to perform oxygenic photosynthesis. In this photosynthetic process, the cyanobacteria carries with it a green-blue photosynthetic pigment to the surface of the crust. When inevitably there is a period of insufficient water again, the M. vaginatus is able to return to a dormant state, migrating back down into the crust and bringing the pigment with it. This process goes along with the rapid turning on of metabolic pathways allowing metabolic functions to occur within the cells in the short periods of time when the crust is hydrated and awakened from dormancy. Cyanobacteria are able to repeat this process over and over again in the event of rehydration in the future.

The amount of time it takes for the greening process in biocrust to occur varies on the environmental conditions in which the biocrust lives. Biocrust can take anywhere from five minutes to 24 hours to awaken from dormancy. The crusts will only awaken if the conditions are conducive to the biocrust.

===== Biological soil crust role in soil hydrology =====
Biocrust influences a soil's microtopography, carbohydrate content, porosity, and hydrophobicity which are the major contributing factors to soil hydrology. The relationship between biocrust and soil hydrology is not fully understood by scientists. It is known that the biocrust does play a role in the absorption and retention of moisture in the soil. In arid and semi-arid environments biocrust can cover over 70% of the soil not being covered by plants, indicating that the relationship between soil, water, and biocrust is extremely pertinent to these environments. Biocrusts has been shown to increase infiltration of water and pore space (or porosity) in soil but the opposite may occur depending on the type of biocrust. The effect biocrust has on water infiltration and the amount of water retained in the soil is greatly dependent on which microorganisms are most dominant in the specific forms of biocrust. Most research studies like that done by Canton et al. support that biological soil crust composed of large amounts of moss and lichens are better able to absorb water resulting in good soil infiltration. In comparison, biocrusts that aredominated by cyanobacteria is more likely to cause biological clogging where the pores of the soil are obstructed by the cyanobacteria responding to the presence of moisture by awakening from their dormancy and swelling. The darkening of the soil surface by biocrust can also raise the soil temperature leading to faster water evaporation. There is limited research, however, that indicates that the rough surface of cyanobacteria traps water runoff and lichen in cyanobacteria-dominant biocrust increase the porosity of the soil allowing for better infiltration than soil that does not have any biocrust.

The type of soil and its texture is also a major determining factor in the biological soil crust's relationship with water retention and filtration. Soils with a large presence of sand (less soil and clay) have high levels of water retention in their surface levels but have limited downward movement of the water. Soils that were less than 80% sand had greater infiltration due to biocrust creating soil aggregates. Other factors like plant roots may play a role in water retention and soil moisture at depths below the soil crust.

=== Role in the biological community ===
==== Effects on vascular plants ====
===== Germination and establishment =====
The presence of biological soil crust cover can differentially inhibit or facilitate plant seed catchment and germination. The increased micro-topography generally increases the probability that plant seeds will be caught on the soil surface and not blown away. Differences in water infiltration and soil moisture also contribute to differential germination depending on the plant species. It has been shown that while some native desert plant species have seeds with self-burial mechanisms that can establish readily in crusted areas, many exotic invasive plants do not. Therefore, the presence of biological soil crusts may slow the establishment of invasive plant species such as cheatgrass (Bromus tectorum).

===== Nutrient levels =====
Biological soil crusts do not compete with vascular plants for nutrients, but rather have been shown to increase nutrient levels in plant tissues, which results in higher biomass for plants that grow near biological soil crusts. This can occur through N fixation by cyanobacteria in the crusts, increased trapment of nutrient-rich dust, as well as increased concentrations of micronutrients that are able to chelate to the negatively charged clay particles bound by cyanobacterial filaments.

==== Effects on animals ====
The increased nutrient status of plant tissue in areas where biological soil crusts occur can directly benefit herbivore species in the community. Microarthropod populations also increase with more developed crusts due to increased microhabitats produced by the crust microtopography.

== Human impacts and management ==
=== Human benefits ===
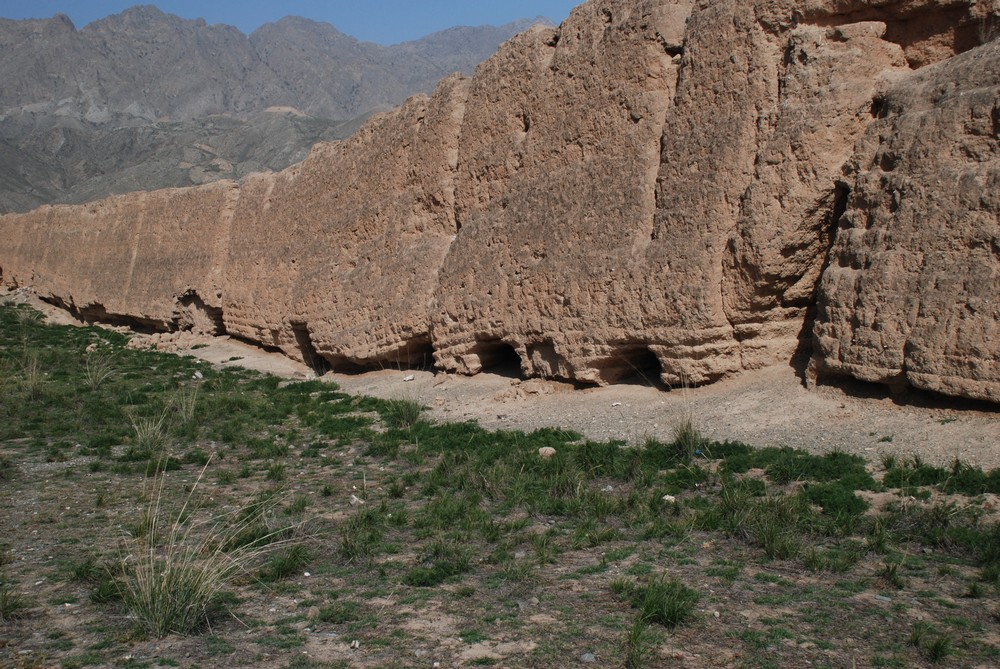
Rammed-earth section of the Great Wall of China. Research shows that biocrust is a natural factor in preserving the structure.

A recent study in China shows that biocrusts have been an important factor in the preservation of sections of the Great Wall built using rammed earth methods.

=== Human disturbance ===
Biological soil crusts are highly susceptible to disturbance from human activities. Compressional and shear forces can disrupt biological soil crusts, especially when they are dry, leaving them to be blown or washed away. Thus, animal hoof impact, human footsteps, off-road vehicles, and tank treads can remove crusts, and these disturbances have occurred over large areas globally. Once biological soil crusts are disrupted, wind and water can move sediments onto adjacent intact crusts, burying them and preventing photosynthesis of non-motile organisms such as mosses, lichens, green algae, and cyanobacteria, and of motile cyanobacteria when the soil remains dry. This kills the remaining intact crust and causes large areas of loss.

Invasive species introduced by humans can also affect biological soil crusts. Invasive annual grasses can occupy areas once occupied by crusts and allow fire to travel between large plants. In contrast, previously, it would have just jumped from plant to plant and not directly affected the crusts.

Climate change affects biological soil crusts by altering the timing and magnitude of precipitation events and temperature. Because crusts are only active when wet, some of these new conditions may reduce the amount of time when conditions are favorable for activity. Biological soil crusts require stored carbon when reactivating after being dry. Suppose they do not have enough moisture to photosynthesize to make up for the carbon used. In that case they can gradually deplete carbon stocks and die. Reduced carbon fixation also leads to decreased nitrogen fixation rates because crust organisms do not have sufficient energy for this energy-intensive process. Without carbon and nitrogen available, they cannot grow nor repair damaged cells from excess radiation.

=== Conservation and management ===
Removing stressors such as grazing or protecting them from disturbance are the easiest ways to maintain and improve biological soil crusts. Protecting relic sites that have not been disturbed can serve as reference conditions for restoration. There are several successful methods for stabilizing soil to allow recolonization of crusts, including coarse litter application (such as straw) and planting vascular plants, but these are costly and labor-intensive techniques. Spraying polyacrylamide gel has been tried, but this has adversely affected photosynthesis and nitrogen fixation of Collema species and thus is less useful. Other methods, such as fertilization and inoculation with material from adjacent sites, may enhance crust recovery, but more research is needed to determine the local costs of disturbance. Today, direct inoculation of soil native microorganisms, bacteria, and cyanobacteria is supposed to be a new step, a biological, sustainable, eco-friendly, and economically effective technique to rehabilitate biological soil crust.
