= Endocarpon riparium =

Scientific classification
- Kingdom: Fungi
- Division: Ascomycota
- Class: Eurotiomycetes
- Order: Verrucariales
- Family: Verrucariaceae
- Genus: Endocarpon
- Species: E. riparium

Binomial name
- Endocarpon riparium Aptroot & M.Cáceres (2016)
- Holotype: Amapá National Forest, Brazil

Species of lichen

Endocarpon riparium is a species of corticolous (bark-dwelling) squamulose lichen in the family Verrucariaceae. This lichen was discovered growing near rivers in the Brazilian Amazon, where it forms patches on wood, tree bark, and rocks that are sometimes underwater. It reproduces by producing small detachable pieces along its edges rather than through typical spore-bearing structures, making it unusual among related species.

== Taxonomy ==
Endocarpon riparium was described as new to science in 2016 by André Aptroot and Marcela da Silva Cáceres from material collected in the Amapá National Forest (eastern Brazilian Amazon). The holotype was gathered near the field station at about 30 m elevation, on wood in disturbed forest; paratypes came from nearby primary tall forest on tree bark (including occasionally submerged bark) and on siliceous rock. The specific epithet refers to its riparian habitat. The authors placed the species in Endocarpon based on the cortex structure, even though no ascomata were found, and noted that it is the first Endocarpon species described with obvious asexual propagules.

== Description ==
The thallus consists of dense, adglutinated flat squamules that do not overlap and together form rather indeterminate patches. It is corticate (with a cortex), smooth, somewhat shiny, and olive green (turning bright green when wet), without a distinct prothallus. Some margins appear reddish, probably from iron incrustation derived from the substrate or river water. Squamules are about 50–80 μm thick with a 15–25 μm cortex (dilute pale pinkish brown above, hyaline below). The photobiont consists of small chlorococcoid cells (about 5–8 μm in diameter). The lower surface bears branched, hyaline rhizohyphae about 3 μm thick. Margins and cracks are lined with numerous minute (0.1–0.2 mm) dorsiventral lobules of thallus tissue that detach easily and act as vegetative propagules. Ascomata and pycnidia were not observed. Endocarpon riparium is unreactive with standard spot tests; thin-layer chromatography detected no lichen substances.

== Habitat and distribution ==
Endocarpon riparium grows on wood, tree bark, and siliceous rock close to rivers; some collections came from bark that is occasionally submerged. Collections have been made in both disturbed forest and primary tall forest. It is known only from Amapá state in Brazil, where it appears locally common along rivers.
