= Muley Point =

Muley Point may refer to the following places in the United States:

- Muley Point (Iron County, Utah), a cliff
- Muley Point (San Juan County, Utah), a cliff and overlook
