= White Canyon (San Juan County, Utah) =

Canyon in Utah, United States

Coordinates: 37°48′32″N 110°25′47″W

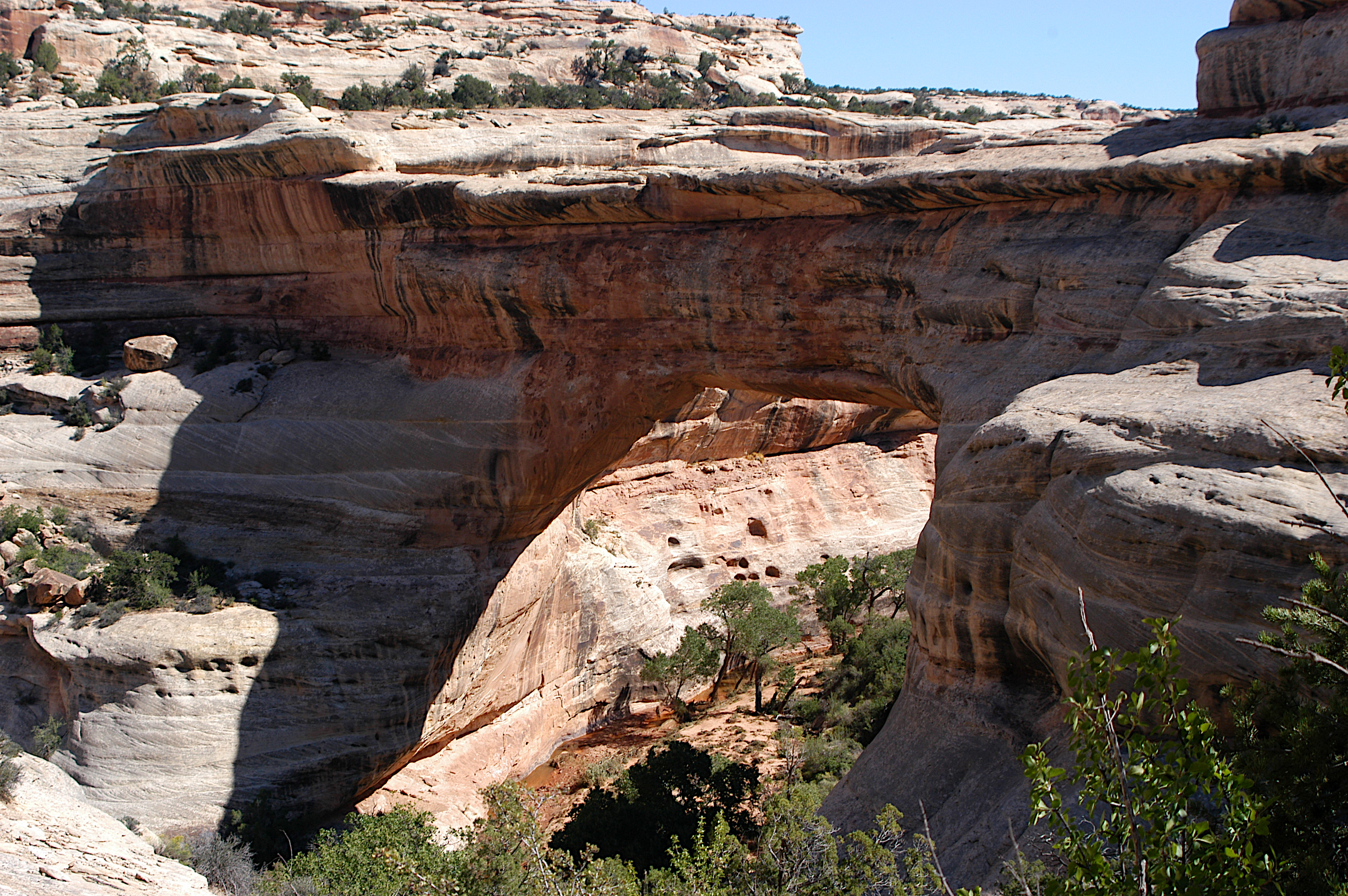
Sipapu Bridge in Natural Bridges National Monument

White Canyon is a canyon in San Juan County, Utah, United States.

== Description ==
The canyon is notable for Ancestral Puebloan cliff dwellings and slot canyons. It is spanned by Sipapu Bridge, one of the largest natural bridges in the world.

The canyon begins in the foothills of the Abajo Mountains and passes through Natural Bridges National Monument before emptying into Lake Powell. Utah State Route 95 parallels the inner gorge of the canyon for much of its length.

One particularly deep and narrow section of White Canyon is known as the Black Hole. The walls in this permanently flooded 500-foot (150 m) long section are only a few feet (about 1 m) apart in some places. Canyoneers sometimes wear wetsuits to guard against hypothermia while traversing this section. The danger of flash flooding is very high due to the canyon's large drainage basin. A 16-year-old girl drowned in a flash flood while hiking in the Black Hole area in September 1996.

== See also ==
- List of canyons and gorges in Utah
