= Natural Bridges National Monument Solar Power System =

Power plant in Utah, U.S.

Coordinates: 37.60793°N 109.97690°W

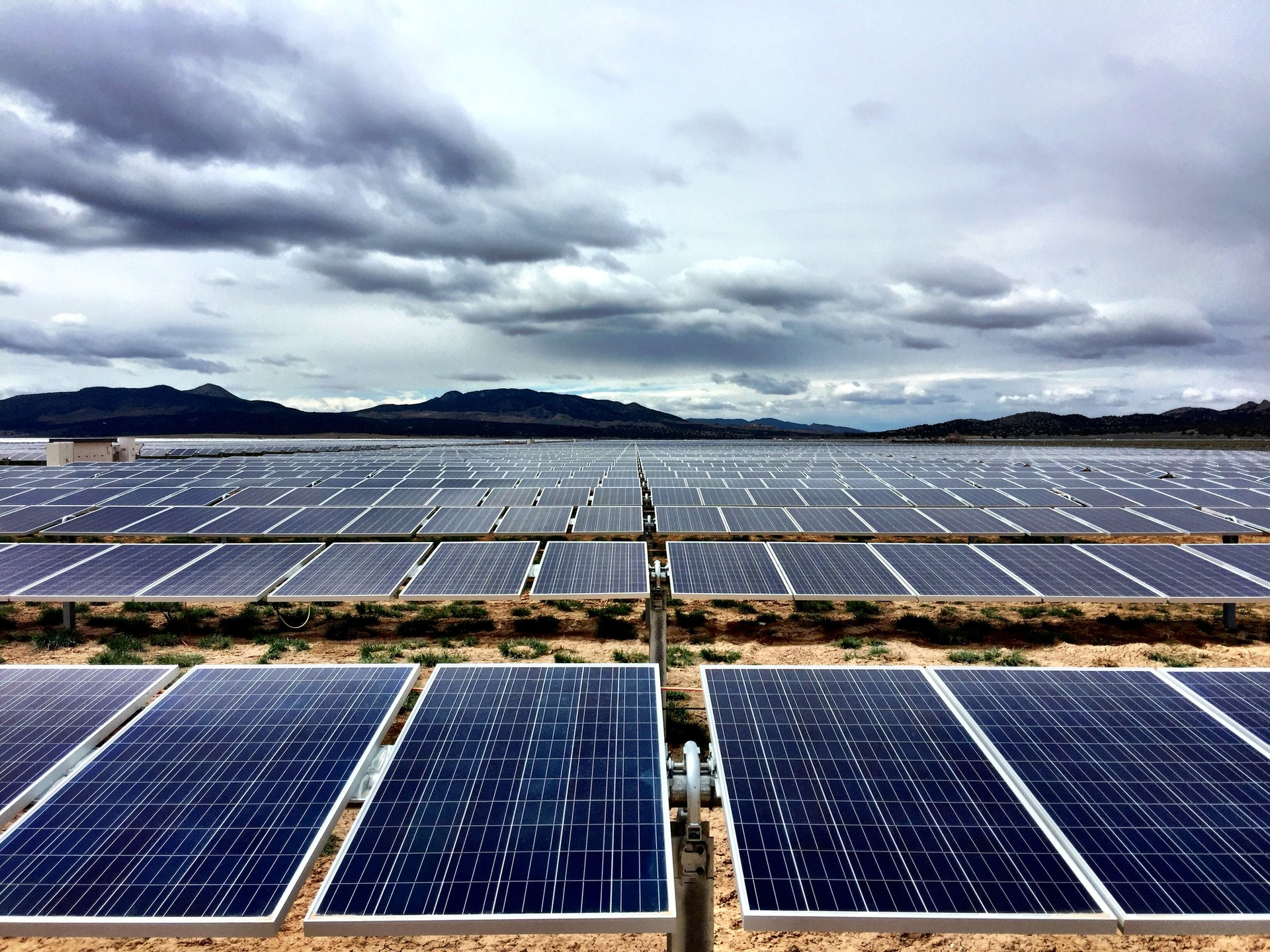
Natural Bridges solar power station

Natural Bridges National Monument Solar Power System is an experimental electrical power plant at the Natural Bridges National Monument in the southeastern portion of the U.S. state of Utah. It consists of 256,812 solar cells arranged in 12 rows, each measuring 200 feet (61 m) long. Direct current energy from the array is converted to alternating current at an equipment building, then supplied to the park's staff buildings and visitor center. Excess energy is stored in a bank of batteries that is used on cloudy days. The system is controlled by computers and creates fewer emissions than the diesel generators that it replaced.

When it was dedicated in June 1980 by the Utah Governor, it was the world's largest solar plant at 100 kW. The solar power station was later downsized to 50 kW and supplemented with a diesel generator backup system which allowed the solar array to operate more efficiently.

== History ==
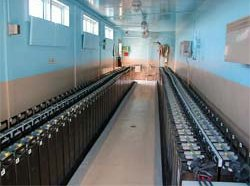
Battery bank installed in 2003

The electrical power plant, located in Natural Bridges National Monument, is a joint experimental venture between the Massachusetts Institute of Technology's Lincoln Laboratory and the United States National Park System and Department of Energy. It was initiated in 1979 and when dedicated in June 1980 by the Utah Governor, it was the world's first solar-power generating system. It is 6,500 feet (2,000 m) above sea level and located in a desert in the southeast corner of the U.S. state of Utah. An array of solar panels are set up and located on 1.3 acres (0.53 ha) adjacent to the park's visitor center. The visitor center has an observation platform nearby overlooking the solar cells and recorded narration explaining the function of the facility. Natural Bridges receives sunlight year-round and is far from other commercial power sources, making it an ideal site for an experimental solar cell power system.

The 1980 project cost $15 million ($49,332,000 in 2022 dollars) and a power plant 30 years later would cost about $1.5 million ($4,933,000 in 2022 dollars) because of technical advances in solar cell production. The power plant operated for 10 years before it was shut down for overhaul and upgrading. The plant was downsized from 100 kW to 50 kW and supplemented with a diesel generator backup system which allowed the solar array to operate more efficiently. At this time the modernization involved adding 18 kW of new state-of-the-art solar modules, replacing the battery bank and upgrading the wiring to a higher gauge. The electric power system was again renovated in 2003 with new 319 kilowatt lead-acid rechargeable batteries and 100 kilowatt electronic DC to AC inverters.

== Characteristics ==
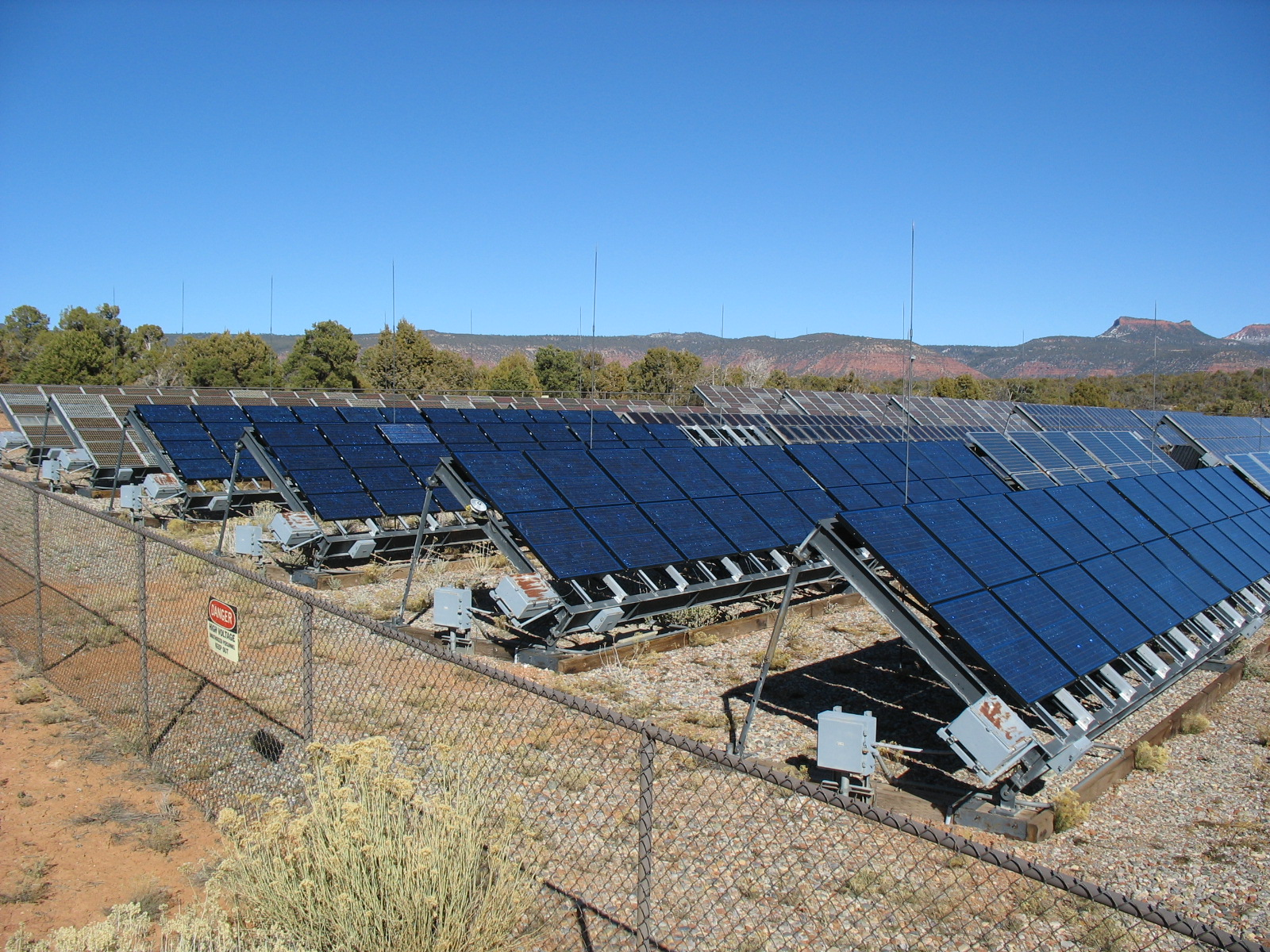
12 rows of framed solar cells in a panel energy collector with an output of 50 to 300 watts each, depending on size and type

The photovoltaic system (PV) plant is 40 miles (64 km) from the nearest power line. It originally consisted of 256,812 individual solar cells with diameters of 2 inches (5.1 cm) and 3 inches (7.6 cm), arranged in 12 rows; these were originally capable of 100 kW at noon with full sunlight. The direct current (DC) power generated by the solar cells is converted to alternating current (AC) power. AC electricity is used for the visitors' center, six staff residences, maintenance facilities, and the local water sanitation system. The system is protected with lightning rods.

When the array started operating, it contained 39 rechargeable lead-acid batteries, each weighing 1,200 pounds (540 kg), with a combined capacity of 600 kWh (2,200 MJ). This provides enough power for the park to operate for two cloudy days, when it typically uses 450 kilowatt-hours (1,600 MJ). There are two 40-kilowatt (54 hp) diesel generators as well. When the batteries are nearly fully charged, the array's control system can disconnect some of the 48 array stations.

The PV system saves $30,000 annually compared to diesel generators that provide the same amount of energy; in addition, the arrays are quieter and produce less air pollution than diesel generators. Furthermore, the PV plant reduces annual emissions by 400 pounds (180 kg) of sulfur oxides, 2,100 pounds (950 kg) of nitrogen oxides, 170 short tons (150 t) of carbon dioxide, and 250 pounds (110 kg) of carbon monoxide.

== Photovoltaic equipment ==
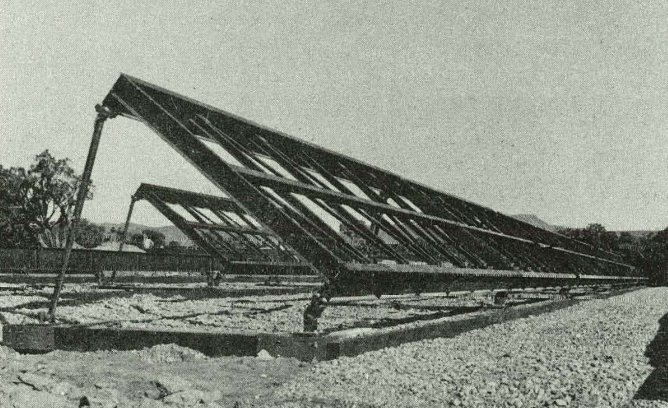
Array field steel frame for solar panels

The array consisted of 12 rows of panels. Each row is approximately 200 feet (61 m) long and has 48 2-kilowatt (2.7 hp) solar cells. The 576 solar panels have a total area of 10,645 square feet (989 m^{2}). They replaced a set of 40-kilowatt diesel generators, which used 1,500 U.S. gallons (5,700 L) of diesel fuel each month. The costly diesel fuel had to be trucked to the Park facilities and came from 100 miles (160 km) to 130 miles (210 km) away. The network of rows of panels required 288 piers to support them. Each pier is 18 inches (46 cm) in diameter and ranged in depth from 1 foot (0.30 m) to 6 feet (1.8 m) depending on the engineer's assessment of the load and the depth of the subsurface rock. The surveying for the location of each of the piers began August 1, 1979.

The solar panel array field is composed of ninety-six steel frames. Each measure 8 feet (2.4 m) by 24 feet (7.3 m) and weigh 1,500 pounds (680 kg). These frames have twelve additional frames mounted within them. There are a total of 1152 sub-frame assemblies. These frame components were assembled off-site and shipped to the site as needed for the construction schedule. The Lincoln Laboratory of the Massachusetts Institute of Technology had hired Ford, Bacon, and Davis Incorporated of Salt Lake City as their main contractors for all the design work and installation of the steel frames for the array field of solar panels.

== Photovoltaic equipment building ==
The photovoltaic equipment building of 1980 is divided into three rooms. One room is for the battery subsystem that contained the large heavy duty batteries. Another room is for the power distribution equipment. The third room had the computer control systems and work space. The photovoltaic equipment building is designed and constructed by the National Park Service contractors under management of MIT Lincoln Laboratory. The batteries, inverters, and chargers were first tested at MIT and then shipped to the site. The batteries had a storage capacity of 600 kWh. Power wires were run to a building of diesel generators as a back-up. Electric meters were installed to measure the building power consumption and energy used by the complete site.

The building design had energy saving techniques that did not allow the sun to penetrate it. The construction included triple-glazed windows, fully insulated exterior walls, placement of windows away from direct sun, and thermal shutters. A built in safety feature is a blow-out panel in case of a battery explosion so that debris objects would go away from employees. The internal walls of the room housing the electrical equipment, which included the inverter and battery charger, were covered with sound-proofing material. The room had a black painted gypsum board covering on the concrete walls and is covered with a vinyl siding. There were eye wash stations made and a lightning grid protection system. The exterior walls were covered with standard sheets of plywood and then covered with cedar siding to follow the park architecture. There were fans and air-conditioners installed. The floors were covered with a vinyl asbestos tile.

Battery equipment

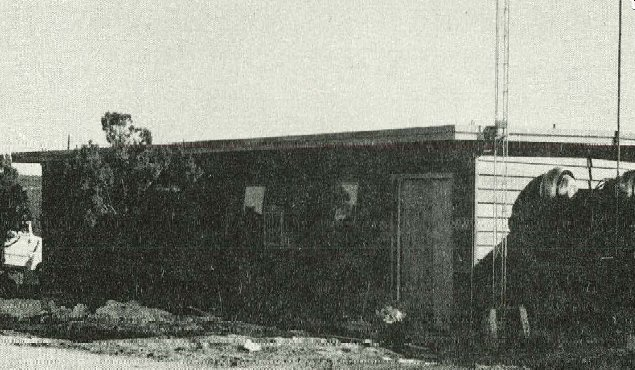
Photovoltaic building containing the batteries and electrical controls

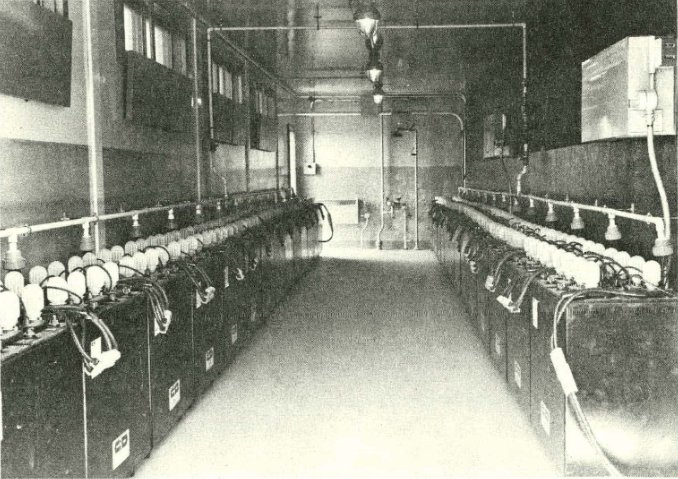
Banks of batteries inside photovoltaic building battery room

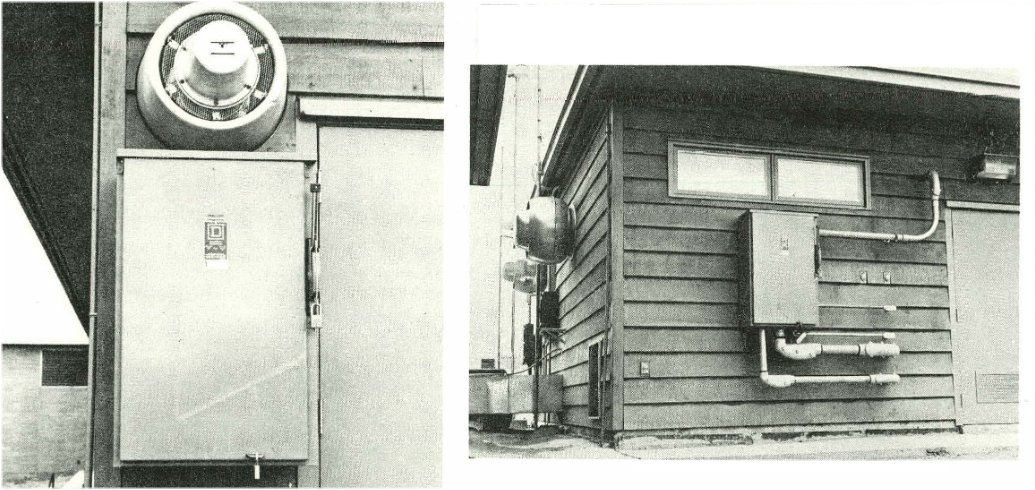
Battery disconnect switches on exterior of photovoltaic building
Switching and computer equipment

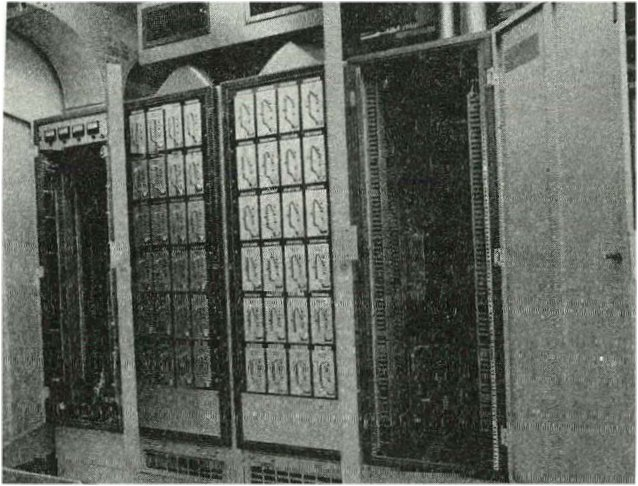
Array field switching electrical controls inside photovoltaic building

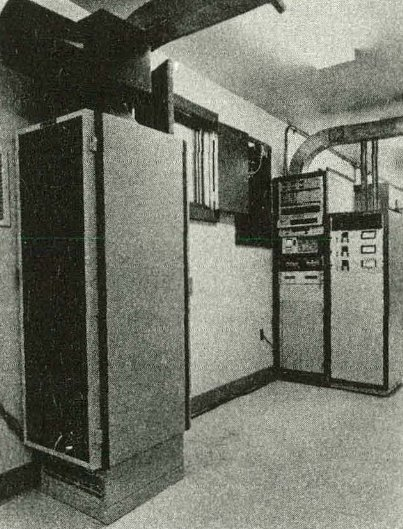
Computer control equipment inside photovoltaic building

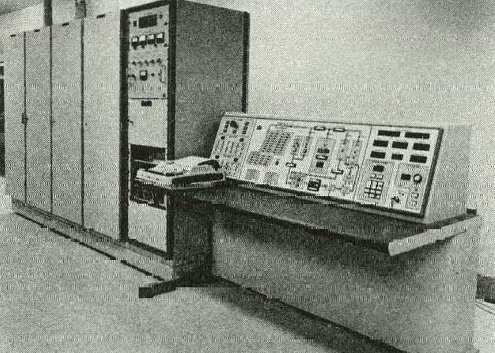
Master control computers and console panel for electricity distribution

== Sources ==
- Anzovin, Steven (2000). Famous first facts, international edition. H.W. Wilson. ISBN 9780824209582. "Item 2070 - The first power plant using solar cells was dedicated in the United States on June 7, 1980, by Governor Scott Matheson at Natural Bridges National Monument in the state of Utah, USA."
- Benoit, A.E. (1980). Construction of photovoltaic power system of Natural Bridges National Monument. Cambridge, Massachusetts: Massachusetts Institute of Technology. doi:10.2172/6727596. OCLC 1065698976. OSTI 6727596.
- Department of the Interior and Agencies Appropriations 1996. Washington, D.C.: United States government. 1995. ISBN 9780160469596. OCLC 1298029784.
- IUCNNR, International Union Conservation of Nature & Natural Resources (1980). Parks. Washington, D.C.: United States government. OCLC 173329893.
