= Lichens and nitrogen cycling =

Some types of lichen are able to fix nitrogen from the atmosphere. This process relies on the presence of cyanobacteria as a partner species within the lichen. The ability to fix nitrogen enables lichen to live in nutrient-poor environments. Lichen can also extract nitrogen from the rocks on which they grow.

Nitrogen fixation, and hence the abundance of lichen and their host plants, may be decreased by application of nitrogen-based agricultural fertilizer and by atmospheric pollution.

== The nitrogen cycle ==
The nitrogen cycle is one of the Earth's biogeochemical cycles. It involves the conversion of nitrogen into different chemical forms. The main processes of the nitrogen cycle are the fixation, ammonification, nitrification, and denitrification. As one of the macronutrients, nitrogen plays an important role in plant growth. The nitrogen cycle is affected by environmental factors. For example, in the subarctic heath, increase in temperature can cause nitrogen fixation to increase or decrease based on season, while overall climate warming indirectly caused the vegetation change which in turn affected the nitrogen fixation process.

== Lichens ==
Lichens are symbiotic organisms that play an important role in the biogeochemical cycle on Earth. The characteristics of lichens, such as strong resistance to factors such as desiccation, ability to grow and break down rocks allow lichen to grow in different types of environment including highly nitrogen limited area such as subarctic heath. While it does not occur often, formation of akinetes (type of cell formed by cyanobacteria which are resistant to cold and desiccation) was observed in nitrogen fixing lichen. Depending on its partner, lichens derive the carbon and nitrogen from algal and cyanobacteria photobionts (which fixes nitrogen from the air). Lichen fungi can fix nitrogen during the day and night, as long the dark period is not too long.

=== Nitrogen-fixing and non-nitrogen-fixing lichens ===
Both nitrogen-fixing lichens and non-nitrogen-fixing lichens take up nitrogen from the environment as a nutrient. Both type of lichens secrete many different organic compounds to absorb minerals from the substrates.

Main difference between nitrogen fixing lichen and non-nitrogen fixing lichen is their photosynthetic partner: nitrogen fixing lichen partner with cyanobacteria which can fix nitrogen from the air, while green alga, partner of non nitrogen fixing lichen, does not perform the same process. The nitrogen fixation is energetically costly due to chemical transformation and only about 10% of lichen are partnered with cyanobacteria. In agricultural regions, non nitrogen fixing lichen reflect uptake of ammonia emission indicating that it have lower nitrogen value.

Some lichens such as Placopsis gelada contain both nitrogen fixing phototrophs and non nitrogen-fixing phototrophs in which Nostoc (cyanobacteria, the phototrophic nitrogen fixer) was dwelling within cephalodia (small gall like structure within lichen; contains cyanobacteria symbionts). In such cases, heterocyst differentiation was greater in cephalodia when compared to having Nostoc as the primary symbionts in lichens, showing that, in the presence of non nitrogen-fixing phototroph, Nostoc specialize for nitrogen fixation.

== Interaction with lichen ==
=== Response to nitrogen and phosphorus ===
A lichen's response to nutrient enrichment depends on not only on species and environmental factors but also partially on thallus concentrations of nutrients such as nitrogen and phosphorus.

Ammonium, nitrate and organic nitrogen can be assimilated by lichen along with phosphorus as an important stimulant for cyanolichens. The photobiont will become less dependent on fungal nutrient supply when nitrogen deposition increases as it will be able to access its own nitrogen and it will stimulate the photobiont, causing it to build up, resulting in increased photosynthesis which increases carbon input. However, for lichens that cannot increase their photobiont growth, nitrogen deposition can be damaging due to higher nitrogen concentration than their biological requirements.

Generally, when a lichenized algal cell is nitrogen limited, the addition of nitrogen caused the growth of algal cells. Under nitrogen limiting condition, chlorophyll concentration was positively correlated with the growth of algal cells indicating that should the concentration of chlorophyll increase, the photobiont population will also increase. As lichens absorb nitrogen through fixation, it will have a very strong negative reaction if the nitrogen availability changes, indicating its sensitivity to environmental changes. According to the experiment by Sparrius et al., when nitrogen fertilizer was added into the soil, lichen cover was reduced by ~50%, while the addition of phosphorus showed opposite result. In the region such as boreal forest, where nitrogen and phosphorus are limiting nutrients and for symbiotic interaction to occur properly, their ratio must be balanced. General pollution of climate that is indicated by the concentration of nitrogen oxides can also affect the growth of lichen. When compared to bryophyte (non-vascular land plant), which is also sensitive to nitrogen fertilizer, lichen showed a much stronger response.

=== Nitrogen metabolism ===
There are many different species of lichens and each has its own way of allocating nitrogen. The non nitrogen fixing lichen invests a large amount of nitrogen into photosynthetic tissue, whereas nitrogen fixing lichen will invest into the fungal tissue. Nitrogen-fixing lichen species can only attain a certain amount of nitrogen, as the addition of ammonium decreases its rate of nitrogen-fixation, which decreases the amount of nitrogen that is exported into the adjacent hyphae. Nitrogen fixation is energy dependent and very costly for lichens. In a region where nitrogen deposition is high, lichens have a lower uptake of nitrogen in comparison to the Antarctic green algal lichen, which takes up 90% of nitrogen deposition in both nitrate and ammonium form. Some lichen species are able to refrain from assimilating excessive amount of nitrogen in order to maintain a balanced tissue concentration. Majority of lichen species absorbs more NH4+ than NO3- and the impact of temperature on the rate of fixation is "consonant to the normal enzymatic kinetics of them".

=== Effects of nitrogen fixation ===
Nitrogen fixing lichens actively fix atmospheric nitrogen using the nostoc, located in the cephalodia. Lichens are sensitive to nitrogen availability. Upon nitrogen fixation, there will be an increase of algal cell growth, chlorophyll concentration, and photobiont population. While costly, in regions where nitrogen availability is low, fixation process is the main way for the lichen to absorb nitrogen which is macronutrient (essential nutrient).

== Importance ==
=== Ecology ===
Nitrogen, as a macronutrient and a biogeochemical cycle, also affects the ecology. Through the nitrogen cycle, it breaks down into the chemical form that allows plants to absorb as nutrients. There are certain regions in the world that most plants cannot live due to harsh environments as well as lack of nutrients such as nitrogen. That means that in some regions, the biogeochemical cycle (including nitrogen cycle and carbon cycle) is unlikely to run smoothly. Lichen is able to absorb nitrogen in multiple forms from soil, rock, and air, taking a part in carbon cycle at the same time. Even though only a small fraction of lichens have the ability to fix nitrogen, it helps the lichen to spread throughout the world and survive even in the harsh environment.

The industrial nitrogen fertilizer greatly affected the vegetation and agriculture throughout the world, resulting significantly increased the amount of food with better quality, but it has a negative impact on ecology in the long run. Deposition of nitrogen causes soil acidification, and the nitrogen in the fertilizer are often leached through soil and water, running off the different area. Soil acidification increases toxicity of the soil which reduces plant biodiversity and based on the toxic level of soil acidification, heavy metal such as aluminum and iron can be related to soil water.

=== Rock and soil ===
Earth's mantle contains non-atmospheric nitrogen in the form of rocks and in the soil. Weathering of the rocks and stone are normally caused by physical, chemical and biological processes. Plants cannot absorb nitrogen from rocks, but fungi can. Fungi within lichens can extract nutrients from mineral surfaces by secreting organic acids. The organic acids (e.g. phenolic acids) are important in solubilizing nutrients from inorganic substrates. A study was conducted to test rock phosphate solubilization by lichen-forming fungi. Bacteria that were attached to biotic or abiotic surfaces stimulate exopolysaccharide synthesis. While lichens have the ability to absorb nitrogen from rock, this only accounts for a small portion of the nitrogen cycle compared to the conversion of atmospheric nitrogen as it is more easily available.

=== Effects on vegetation ===
Photobionts will become less dependent on fungal nutrient supply when nitrogen deposition increases, as it will be able to access its own nitrogen, and primary producers' nutrient limit will also be reduced.

Nitrogen is one of the more limiting nutrients and the addition of nitrogen stimulates the photobiont, building up its cell, which subsequently increases its photosynthesis and its carbon input. Multiple nitrogen compounds can be assimilated by lichens, such as NH_{4}^{+}, NO_{3}^{−} and organic nitrogen compounds. Nitrogen deposition reduces the nutrient limitation of primary production. Increase in nitrogen deposition will allow the photobiont to access its own nitrogen which makes it less fungal dependent but only up to certain point.

Depending on the environmental nitrogen availability, the addition of nitrogen can either increase and decrease the growth of the lichen. If the lichen cannot increase its photobiont growth, high nitrogen uptake may result in a higher concentration than it physiologically requires which will negatively affect the lichen and its host plant as the other nutrients are too limiting.

Lichen's response to nutrient enrichment is both species-specific and dependent on environmental factors such as nutrient concentration, light availability and water supply.

== Nitrogen stress ==
Lichen is nitrogen sensitive and change in nitrogen availability can affect its health greatly.

Two main nitrogen stress factors for lichens are nitrogen deficiency and high nitrogen deposition. Both types of nitrogen stress result in the reduction of the rate of thallus expansion in lichen. Nitrogen stressed lichen did not show a significant change in chitin:chlorophyll ratios, but ergosterol concentration showed significant increase indicating a higher demand on the respiratory system.

According to an experiment, the ammonium toxicity due to nitrogen deposition reduced the vitality of lichen greatly at different regions such as inland dunes, boreal conditions, and subarctic heaths.
