= Sipapu Bridge =

Natural bridge in Natural Bridges in San Juan County, Utah, United States

- Rock arch
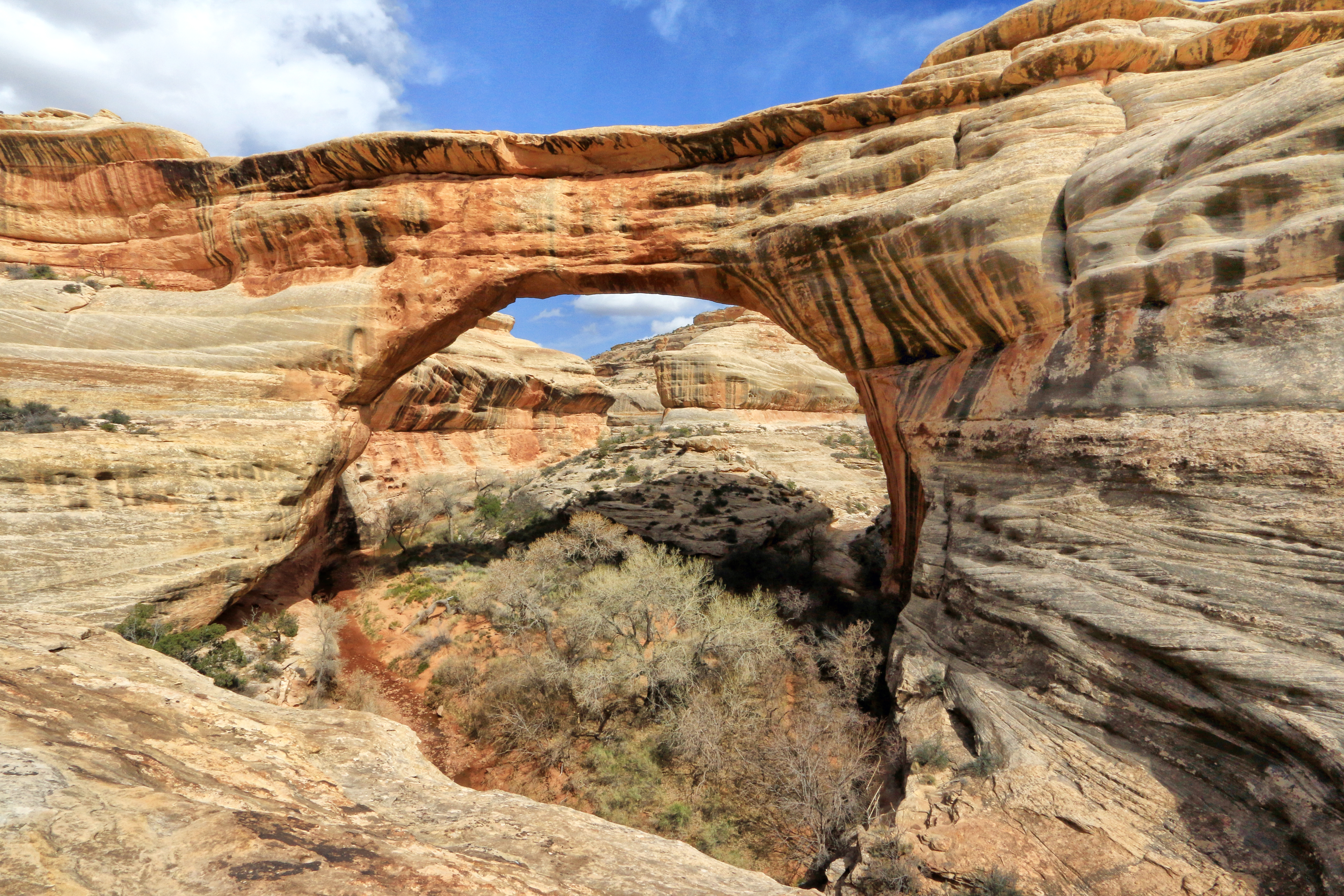
- View of Sipapu Bridge

- Location within Utah Location within the United States
- Coordinates: 37°37′30″N 110°01′02″W
- Location: San Juan County, Utah

Dimensions
  - Length: 255 ft (78 m)
  - Width: 77 ft (23 m)
  - Height: 220 ft (67 m)
- Elevation: 6,027 ft (1,837 m)

Sipapu Bridge is a natural bridge or arch located in the Natural Bridges National Monument in central San Juan County, Utah, United States. The bridge spans White Canyon.

== Description ==
Sipapu was long reported to have a span of 268 feet (82 m) by the National Park Service, ranking it as the fourth longest natural arch in the world. A more accurate measurement obtained by laser survey in 2007 revealed the measurement to be a significant overstatement. The Natural Arch and Bridge Society has published a revised span of 255 feet (78 m), demoting the arch to a thirteenth-place ranking.

Based on specific criteria that separate natural arches from natural bridges, Sipapu is the sixth longest natural bridge after the more well-known Rainbow Bridge also located in Utah, and four Chinese natural bridges—all longer than Rainbow Bridge—which were measured and documented by NABS between 2010 and 2015.

== Access ==
Sipapu can be viewed from a roadside viewpoint, but more fully viewed from a short hiking trail that leads down to its base from the canyon rim. Since the closure of the trail leading under Landscape Arch due to safety concerns, and the voluntary prohibition placed on passing under Rainbow Bridge in deference to Navajo and Hopi spiritual beliefs, Sipapu is now the longest natural arch in the world to have an active trail beneath it that visitors may pass under, affording views of the underside of the arch.

== Name ==
The name of the arch comes from the Hopi word sipapu, a word for a symbolic portal from which the first human ancestors emerged. Earlier names, which still were in use until the mid 20th century, were "President", "Augusta" and "Great Augusta".
