= Muley Point (San Juan County, Utah) =

View from Muley Point, facing south.

Muley Point is a remote cliff and scenic overlook in southern Utah near Mexican Hat in San Juan County, Utah. The view provides panoramic vistas of the desert landscape of southern Utah (Valley of the Gods) and northern Arizona. Monument Valley is visible in the distance while the San Juan River cuts into the canyon below.

Located at the end of a five-mile gravel road off Rte. 261, Muley Point is 25 miles (40 km) south of Natural Bridges National Monument and 20 miles (32 km) north of the Arizona border. Its geographical coordinates are 37°13′59″N 109°59′36″W. It lies at an elevation of 6,230 feet (1,900 meters).
