= Plas Newydd, Llangollen =

House in Denbighshire, Wales

Coordinates: 52.9671°N 3.1655°W

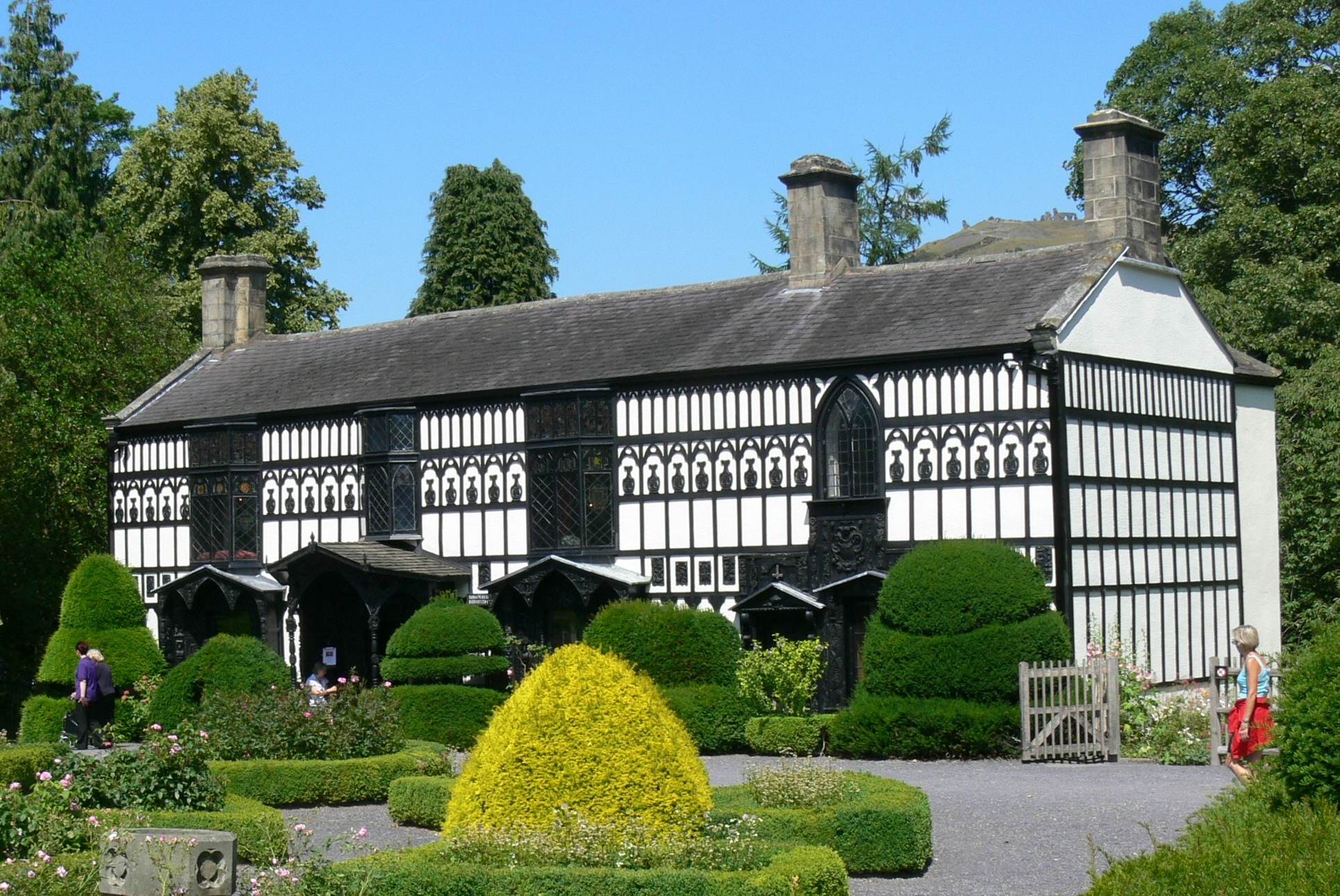
Plas Newydd

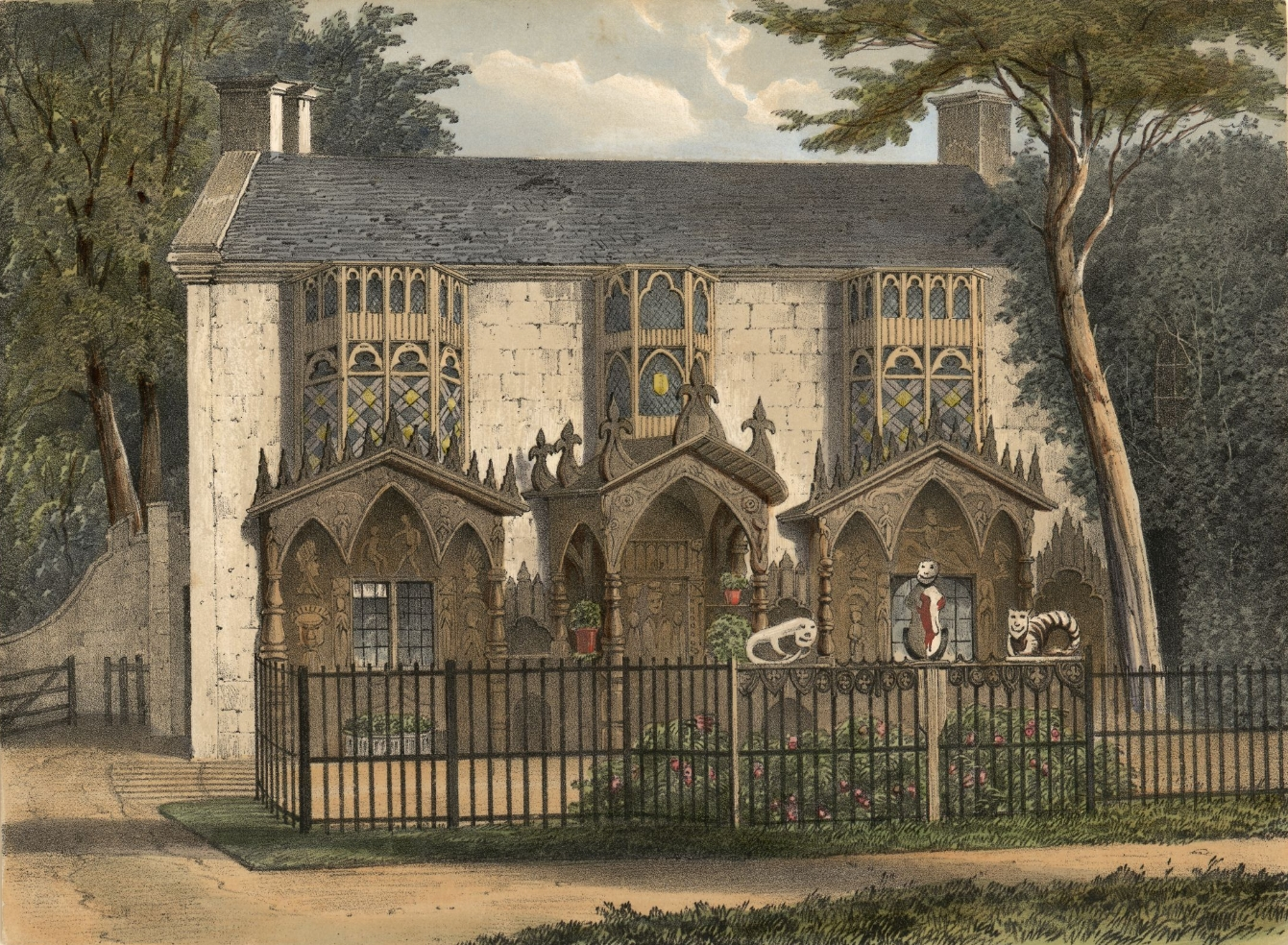
Engraving of Plas Newydd in 1840, by W.L. Walton (fl. 1834–1855).

Plas Newydd (/plæs ˈnoʊɪð/, Welsh pronunciation: [ˈplaːs ˈnɛu̯ɨð]; "new hall" or "new mansion") is a historic house in the town of Llangollen, Denbighshire, Wales, and was the home of the Ladies of Llangollen, Lady Eleanor Butler and Sarah Ponsonby, for nearly 50 years. It is run as a museum by Denbighshire County Council.

== History ==
Plas Newydd is notable as the home where two Irish ladies, Lady Eleanor Butler and Miss Sarah Ponsonby (the Ladies of Llangollen) eloped and set up house together in the late 18th century, scandalising contemporary British society. Plas Newydd was originally a five-roomed stone cottage, but over the years it was enlarged to include many Gothic features. Although originally ostracised by their families, the ladies and their unconventional lifestyle gradually became accepted, and their home was visited by many famous people including Robert Southey, William Wordsworth, Lady Caroline Lamb and Sir Walter Scott, the Duke of Wellington and the industrialist Josiah Wedgwood.

The ladies also expanded and improved the gardens, adding many Gothic features such as a "ruined" archway, rustic bridges over rushing torrents and a temple that included a font removed from the ruined Valle Crucis Abbey. Ornate greenhouses grew exotic fruit, and poetic notices were attached to trees.

After their deaths in 1829 and 1831, the property passed through various hands and saw a number of changes. General John Yorke added the black and white features on the exterior some time between 1861 and 1890 and filled the interior with oddities from around the world. In 1932 the house was acquired by Llangollen Urban District Council and it is now a museum.

== Architecture ==
The original cottage was expanded by the ladies, and then again by subsequent owners in the 19th century. It is now restored to essentially the final structure left by the ladies. Its most unusual feature is the profusion of pieces of reclaimed oak carvings collected by the ladies and set in patchwork style over much of the exterior of the house. These came from broken-up furniture or church fittings, and range in date from the medieval to the Baroque, but with folk and "Jacobean" vernacular styles of shallow carved decoration predominating, as well as Gothic-style black-and-white trim and carvings. The ladies also added much stained glass.

== In popular culture ==
- The house was used in a 1987 episode of the TV series Treasure Hunt.
- It also appeared in the 1989 BBC adaptation of The Voyage of the Dawn Treader (one of the Narnia Chronicles written by C. S. Lewis) as the home of the wizard, Coriakin (played by Preston Lockwood).
- In 2003, the home was featured in the TV series Antiques Road Trip.
- It was also featured on a 2008 series 10 episode of the paranormal reality TV series Most Haunted.
- The house was featured in the UK Channel 5 documentary Walking Britain's Lost Railways presented by Rob Bell.

== Gallery ==
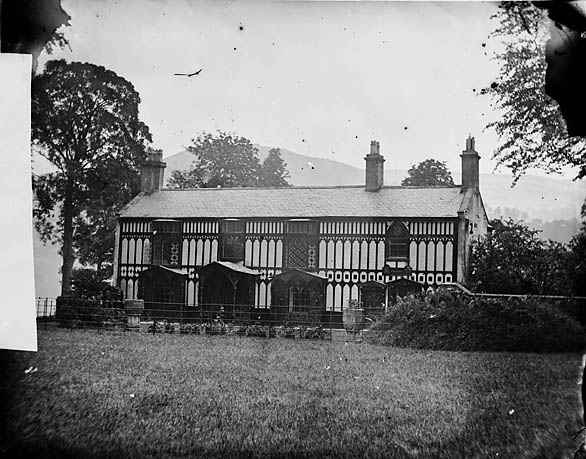
Photograph by John Thomas, around 1875

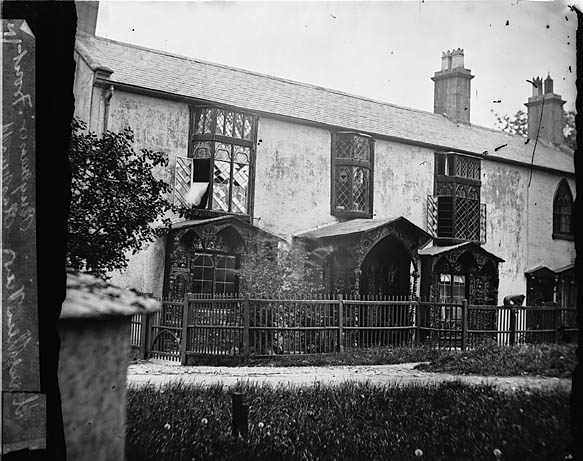
Around 1875

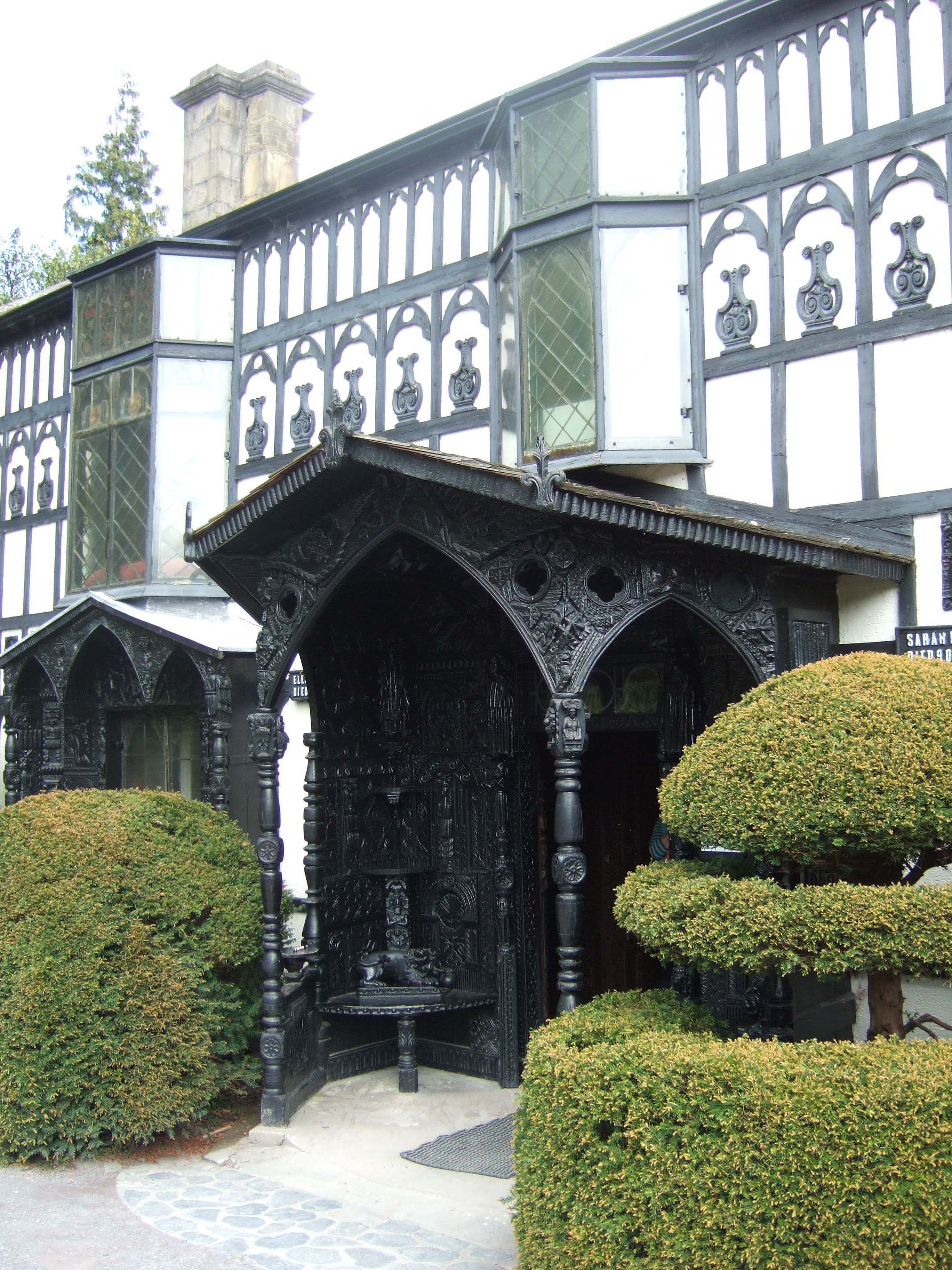
The porch

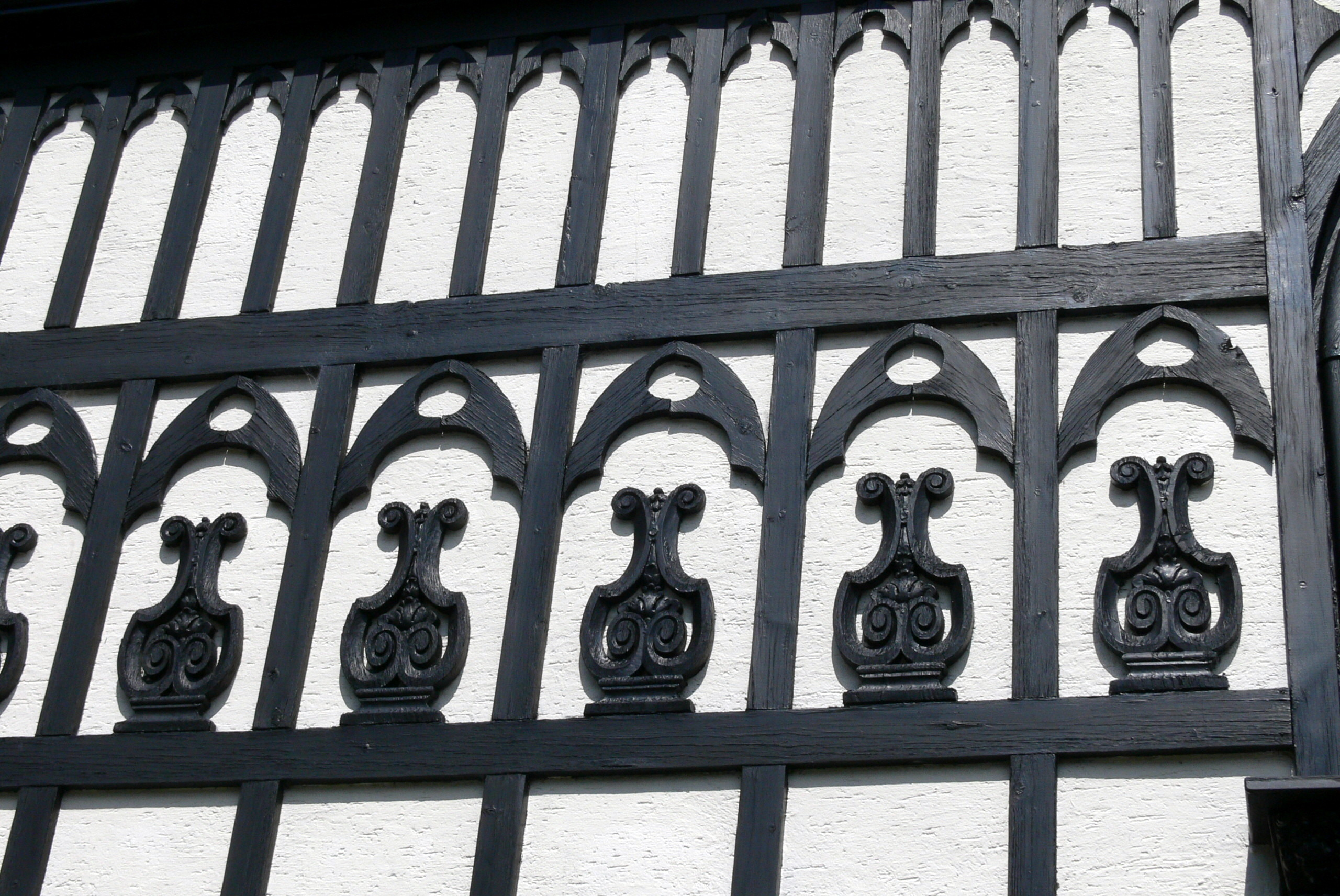
The façade

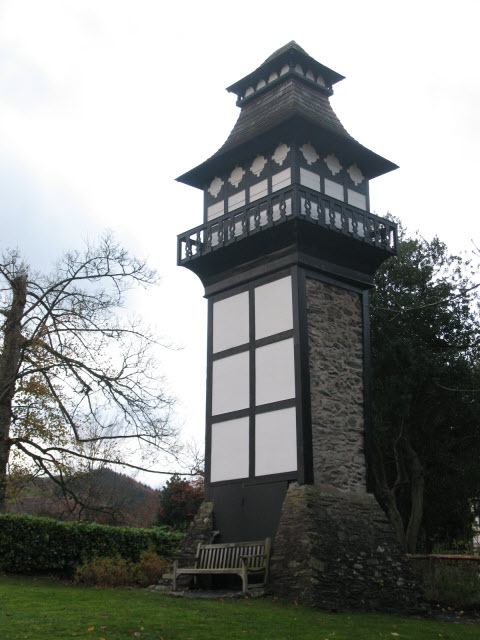
The Plas Newydd Tower
