= Greencastle =

Greencastle or Green Castle may refer to:

== Places ==
=== Germany ===
- Green Castle (Grünes Schloss), Weimar; see Duchess Anna Amalia Library

=== Ireland ===
- Greencastle, County Donegal, Republic of Ireland
- Greencastle, County Antrim, Northern Ireland, a townland and suburb of Belfast
- Greencastle, County Down, Northern Ireland
- Greencastle, County Tyrone, Northern Ireland

=== Scotland ===
- Green Castle, Portknockie, an Iron Age and Pictish promontory fort

=== United States ===
- Greencastle, Indiana, a city
- Greencastle, Missouri, a city
- Greencastle, Pennsylvania, a borough
- Greencastle, West Virginia, an unincorporated community
- Greencastle, Kanawha County, West Virginia, an unincorporated community

== Other uses ==
- Greencastle (film)
