= Walking Britain's Lost Railways =

UK television series

- Genre: Documentary
- Presented by: Rob Bell
- Country of origin: United Kingdom
- Original language: English
- No. of series: 4
- No. of episodes: 20

Production
- Executive producers: Melanie Darlaston; Fintan Maguire
- Producer: Christopher Bruce
- Running time: 48 minutes
- Production companies: Rumpus Media and Motion Content Group

Original release
- Network: Channel 5
- Release: 21 September 2018 – 19 November 2021

Walking Britain's Lost Railways is a British documentary television series presented by Rob Bell that first aired on Channel 5 on 21 September 2018. A second series premiered on Channel 5 on 9 February 2020. A third series premiered on Channel 5 on 27 November 2020. A fourth series premiered on Channel 5 on 15 October 2021.

== History ==
Presenter Rob Bell walks sections of British railways that were closed during the Beeching cuts of the early 1960s, telling the history and current stories associated with the lost routes.

== Episodes ==
| Series | Episodes | Originally released | |
| Series | Episodes | First released | Last released |
|---|---|---|---|
| 1 | 6 | 21 September 2018 | 26 October 2018 |
| 2 | 6 | 9 February 2020 | 24 April 2020 |
| 3 | 4 | 27 November 2020 | 18 December 2020 |
| 4 | 4 | 15 October 2021 | 19 November 2021 |

=== Series 1 (2018) ===
| No. overall | No. in series | Title | Directed by | Original release date | U.K. viewers (millions) |
|---|---|---|---|---|---|
| 1 | 1 | "Scotland" | Adam Kaleta | 21 September 2018 | 1.22 |
Rob walks the former line from Elgin to Portsoy, the Moray line which had originally served both the fishing and whisky industries. The line was decommissioned in the 1960s and he visits the former station at Elgin which was built in 1858 and visits Lossiemouth on the Scottish Riviera and discovers about its former history as a whisky and fishing port. Rob goes onto kayak through Bow Fiddle Rock near Portknockie; wonder at the Spey Bridge in Newtonmore and the several glorious viaducts in Cullen; visit the Glenglassaugh distillery and view a boat race in Portsoy.
| 2 | 2 | "Sheffield" | Adam Kaleta | 28 September 2018 | 1.12 |
Rob starts his journey at the site of the former Sheffield Victoria station, travelling via the Woodhead line to Manchester Piccadilly station. He travels along a remaining stretch of the line that serves Stocksbridge steelworks, visits a miniature railway at Wortley and explores the Woodhead tunnel now home to National Grid power cables. He visits Thurgoland Tunnel where the sound effect of the tunnels shape is demonstrated by a saxophone playing scientist, and then rejoins another remaining section of the line at Hadfield and travels by rail to Manchester.
| 3 | 3 | "Dartmoor" | Adam Kaleta | 5 October 2018 | 1.28 |
Rob starts his journey along the closed Dartmoor line by visiting a model maker who has recreated the Plymouth to Exeter line. He visits Tavistock where he learns about Rabbit Pie, and then goes on to visit the Ambrosia Cream Rice factory to discover how the railway helped it expand. He travels along The Granite Way cycle route that now occupies part of the track beds. At Okehampton, he meets members of the Dartmoor Railway Association who campaigned to re-open the line to Exeter.
| 4 | 4 | "Lake District" | Adam Kaleta | 12 October 2018 | 1.12 |
In this episode Rob walks the former Penrith to Cockermouth line in Cumbria. Along the way he visits Keswick Station to discover colourful stories, hears about the tragic story of engineer Thomas Bouch, visits a former ore mine and tells story of the decline of the line by the advent of the motorcar with help from the Lakeland Motor Museum.
| 5 | 5 | "Somerset and Dorset" | Adam Kaleta | 19 October 2018 | 1.03 |
Rob walks the former Somerset and Dorset line closed in 1966. He visits the start of the line in Burnham on Sea where he hears about its history from local historian John Strickland. Following the line through Highbridge across the Somerset Levels he discovers the complicated issues that engineers had to deal with when creating the railway and the high costs that were involved, including a 26-mile stretch that cost an equivalent £35 million today. At Glastonbury he meets Tor, a local guide who discusses the resurgent interest in Arthurian Legend. He then visits the northern stretch to Bath through the Coombe Down Tunnel, UK's longest without intermediate ventilation which faced a tragic accident and is now part of a national cycle route.
| 6 | 6 | "Wales" | Adam Kaleta | 26 October 2018 | 1.18 |
Rob walks along the former railway line between Ruabon and Barmouth in North Wales which had been a busy route prior to its closure in 1965. Along the way he visits the Pontcysyllte Aqueduct; rides the Llangollen Railway, canoes on Bala Lake and rides the Bala Lake Railway; hears the local sounds from a Harpist in Dolgellau and examines its history as a tourist line during the Victorian period.

=== Series 2 (2020) ===
| No. overall | No. in series | Title | Directed by | Original release date | U.K. viewers (millions) |
|---|---|---|---|---|---|
| 7 | 1 | "Derbyshire" | Rosie Saunders | 9 February 2020 | 1.124 |
In Derbyshire, Rob travels along a stretch of what was once part of the London to Manchester express route, through the glorious countryside of Derbyshire and the Peak District National Park.
| 8 | 2 | "The Durham Coalfields" | Lucy Joyner | 16 February 2020 | 0.952 |
Rob Bell explores the era when our modern railways were born in the industrial heartlands of the North-East, where for over 150 years coal was king. Visiting former collieries, living museums and meeting former miners, he tells the story of the 1822 Hetton line, the world's first railway designed for steam locomotives.
| 9 | 3 | "North Wales" | Rosie Saunders | 3 April 2020 | 1.268 |
Rob Bell travels to Bangor, where he explores a lost line that was built in 1801 to transport Welsh slate from the local quarry, down to the sea.
| 10 | 4 | "Royal Deeside " | Rosie Saunders | 10 April 2020 | 1.018 |
Rob journeys through the Scottish Highlands, following a path cut by the world's first global star - Queen Victoria.
| 11 | 5 | "Norfolk " | Lucy Joyner | 17 April 2020 | 1.348 |
Rob follows the line of the Midland and Great Northern Joint Railway from King's Lynn to Great Yarmouth, discovering a lost railway through some of the quietest parts of England, but also some of the richest country estates of all.
| 12 | 6 | "Edinburgh " | Rosie Saunders | 24 April 2020 | 1.243 |
Rob follows the Waverley Line, which stretches for 100 miles south from Edinburgh.

=== Series 3 (2020) ===
| No. overall | No. in series | Title | Directed by | Original release date | U.K. viewers (millions) |
|---|---|---|---|---|---|
| 13 | 1 | "North Devon" | Matt Cottingham | 27 November 2020 | 1.513 |
Rob explores two of North Devon's former railways - the Ilfracombe branch line of the London & South Western Railway (LSWR) that ran from Barnstaple to Ilfracombe, and the Barnstaple to Lynton line.
| 14 | 2 | "Walking Scotland's Lost Railways: Highlands" | Matt Cottingham | 4 December 2020 | 1.537 |
Rob is in the Scottish Highlands recounting the history of the Callander and Oban Railway, which ran through west Scotland's rugged countryside for 57 years.
| 15 | 3 | "Cotswolds" | Matt Cottingham | 11 December 2020 | 1.392 |
Rob examines the history of the Banbury and Cheltenham Direct Railway, which was in use for over 100 years until its closure in 1969.
| 16 | 4 | "East Midlands" | Matt Cottingham | 18 December 2020 | 1.217 |
Rob is in the East Midlands, examining the impact of Edward Watkin's Great Central Railway, which ran from Manchester, through the Midlands and onto London.

=== Series 4 (2021) ===
| No. overall | No. in series | Title | Directed by | Original release date | U.K. viewers (millions) |
|---|---|---|---|---|---|
| 17 | 1 | "Walking Yorkshire's Lost Railways" | Matt Cottingham | 15 October 2021 | N/A |
Rob is in Yorkshire, looking into the history of the line built to connect York to Hull, via Beverley, and the part played by "The Railway King" George Hudson.
| 18 | 2 | "Walking Cornwall's Lost Railways" | Matt Cottingham | 22 October 2021 | N/A |
Rob travels across Cornwall's first two railway lines—the Portreath Tramroad and Redruth and Chasewater Railway, where he learns more about the vital role they played in the county's mining industry.
| 19 | 3 | "Walking Kent's Lost Railways" | Matt Cottingham | 29 October 2021 | N/A |
Rob visits Kent and the abandoned Elham Valley Railway, where he delves into its important past during the two world wars.
| 20 | 4 | "Walking Northern Ireland's Lost Railways" | Matt Cottingham | 19 November 2021 | N/A |
Exploring the lost railways of Northern Ireland, Rob travels along the route of its first railway to be built, from Belfast on the east coast, via Armagh, to Bundoran on the west coast.
