= Alexander Mair (physician) =

Scottish public health expert

Prof Alexander Mair OBE FRSE DPH (9 September 1912 – 6 August 1995) was a Scottish public health expert.

== Life ==
He was born in Portknockie in northern Scotland on 9 September 1912, the son of local herring fisherman, Alexander Mair (1881–1941) and his wife, Jessie Slater. His father worked on the Zulu class trawler "Evangeline". He was educated locally and left school at the then normal UK age of 14. He worked in the fishing industry (the mainstay of the local community) but was an on-shore clerk overseeing catches in Buckie rather than being a fisherman.

Not until the onset of the Second World War was he inspired to study medicine, joining Aberdeen University as a mature student in 1939 and graduating MB ChB in 1942. He then joined the Royal Army Medical Corps and was stationed first in Normandy in the aftermath of the D-Day landings and later in Brussels, rising to the rank of captain.

After the war he returned to academia gaining a Diploma in Public Health at Aberdeen then beginning lecturing in Public Health 1948. In 1952 he became Senior Lecturer in Public Health at St Andrews University's medical school in Dundee and was given his Professorship in 1954 at what was then Queen's College, Dundee. His chair transferred to the new University of Dundee on Queen's College's separation from St Andrews in 1967.

He was elected a Fellow of the Royal Society of Edinburgh in 1980. His proposers were John McQueen Johnston, Anthony Elliot Ritchie, John Cameron, Lord Cameron, R. M. S. Smellie.

He was married to Nancy Waddington, the sister of Cabinet minister Baron Waddington.

He retired in 1982 and died of a cardiac arrest in Broughty Ferry on 6 August 1995. He is buried with his parents at Portknockie.

== Publications ==
- Silicosis in Aberdeen Granite Workers
- Sir James MacKenzie GP (1853–1925)

== Family ==
He was married to Nancy Waddington and had three children.
