= Green Castle, Portknockie =

Archaeological site in Moray, Scotland

Green Castle
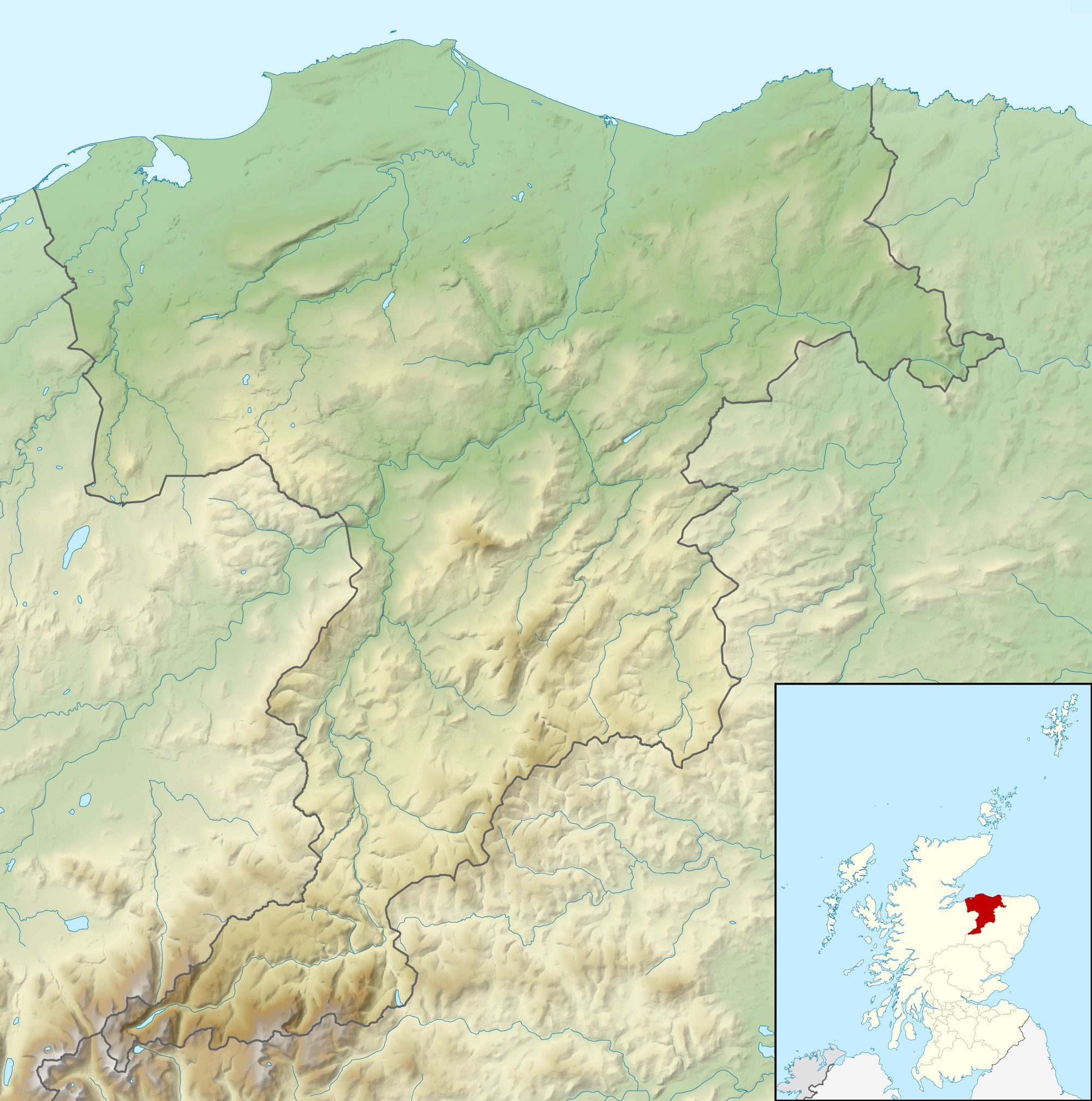
- Location within Moray
- 57.70607°N 2.85894°W
- Type: Promontory fort
- Periods: Iron Age, Pictish

Site notes
- Length: 70 metres (230 ft)
- Width: 15 metres (49 ft)

Green Castle is a naturally defended rocky outcrop in the village of Portknockie in Moray, Scotland, that was occupied successively by small promontory forts of the Iron Age and Pictish periods.

The site forms a rocky headland 70 metres (230 ft) long and 15 metres (49 ft) wide, surrounded by steep cliffs rising 20 metres (66 ft) high above the sea. The site was extensively excavated between 1976 and 1982.

During the Iron Age a single palisade was built to protect the headland at its landward side. Traces of the slot created by these timbers, together with an Iron Age sherd and pits have been excavated. This occupation period produced evidence of metalworking, including fragments of moulds, furnaces, hammerstones and whetstones. Ard marks over the upper surfaces of Iron Age archaeological layers suggest that the site was then used for agriculture before being reused for defensive purposes during the Pictish period.

A new timber palisade backfilled by beach cobbles marked a first phase of Pictish activity on the site. The fort was then extensively rebuilt in the 7th and 8th centuries – possibly in response to the start of Norse raids on the northern Pictish Kingdom of Fortriu – with a more sophisticated structure of timber-laced stone ramparts protecting a central stone hall. These defences were later destroyed by fire, possibly the result of a Viking siege.

During the 19th century the site was used for fish drying and most of the area was covered by low stone platforms.

== Bibliography ==
- Konstam, Angus (2010). Strongholds of the Picts: The Fortifications of Dark Age Scotland. Oxford: Osprey Publishing. ISBN 9781846036866.
- "Green Castle, Portknockie". Moray Sites and Monuments Record. Moray Council.
