= Greencastle, Kanawha County, West Virginia =

Greencastle, West Virginia
- Unincorporated community
- Location within West Virginia and the United States Greencastle (the United States)
- Coordinates: 38°3′48″N 81°22′22″W
- Country: United States
- State: West Virginia
- County: Kanawha
- Elevation: 850 ft (260 m)
- Time zone: UTC-5 (Eastern (EST))
  - Summer (DST): UTC-4 (EDT)
- GNIS feature ID: 1554608

Greencastle is an unincorporated community in Kanawha County, West Virginia, United States. It is located at an elevation of 850 feet (259 m).
