= Portknockie =

Coordinates: 57.7027°N 2.8597°W

Portknockie: Scottish Gaelic: Port Chnocaidh
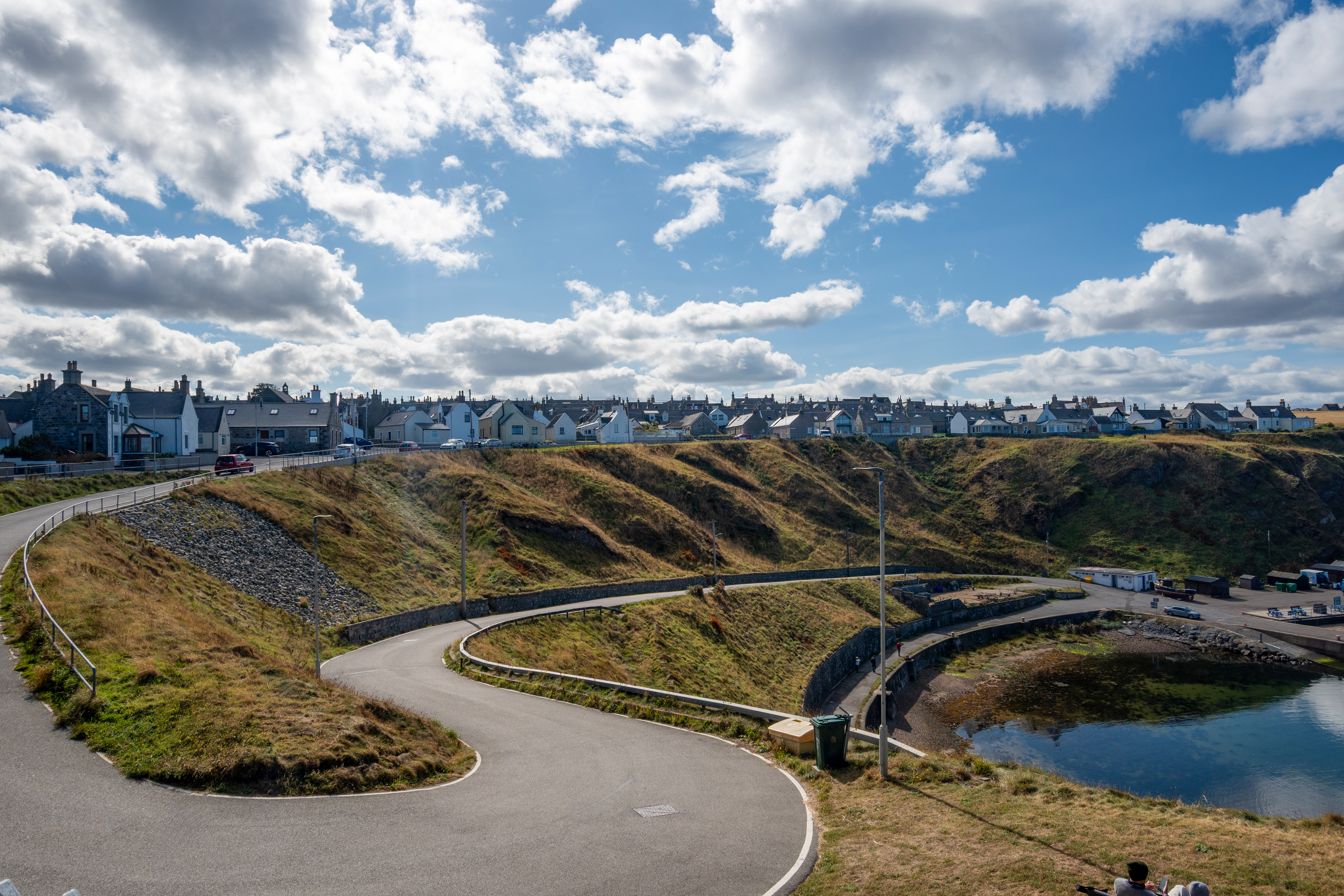

- Location within Moray
- Population: 1,230 (2020)
- Council area: Moray
- Country: Scotland
- Sovereign state: United Kingdom
- Police: Scotland
- Fire: Scottish
- Ambulance: Scottish
- Website: village website

Portknockie (Scottish Gaelic: Port Chnocaidh, the hilly port) is a coastal village on the Moray Firth within Moray, Scotland.

The village's name is written as Portknockies in the Old Parish Registers. This would suggest that the port's name referred to not one, but two rocky hills at the hythe - the Port Hill and the Greencastle. Nearby towns include Buckie, Findochty and Cullen.

Historically in Banffshire, the village was founded in 1677 and it became a significant herring fishing port during the nineteenth century, although today only a handful of commercial inshore boats remain.

A comparison of the First and Second Edition Six-inch Ordnance Survey Maps, published in 1870 and 1905 respectively shows how the harbour and the town developed during the intervening years.

The town was on the railway network, until Portknockie station closed in 1968.

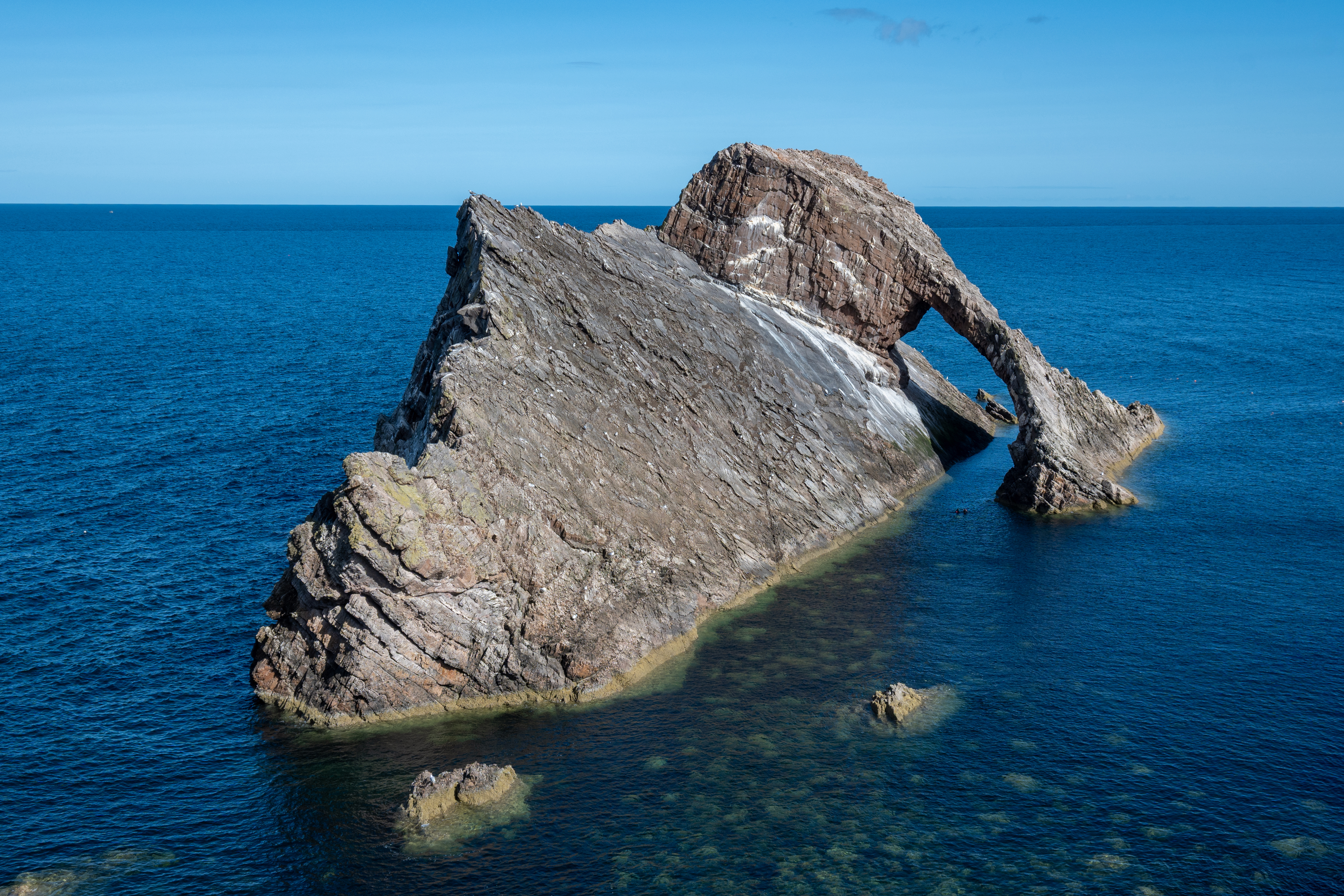
Bow Fiddle Rock

A popular site in Portknockie is Bow Fiddle Rock, a large rock about 15 metres (49 ft) high just off the coast. The quartzite structure has a large sea arch, which somewhat resembles the bow of a fiddle, making it an example of a natural arch.

Small numbers of seabirds nest on the coastal cliffs. These include fulmar, black-legged kittiwake, common gull, razorbill and shag. Additionally common eider can be seen in and around the harbour and coves during the summer months.

== Notable residents ==
- Prof Alexander Mair (1912-1995) was born and raised in the village and is buried there with his parents.

== Green Castle Fort ==
Another historical site within the village is the Green Castle, which is located on a coastal promontory.

This ancient coastal fort was revealed to date from 1000 BC and was inhabited until 1000 AD. The castle foundations can be seen, although now covered in grass.

== Fishing ==
Reporting on all the fishing ports in the Buckie District (Cullen, Portknockie,Findochty,Portessie,Buckie and Portgordon) the Annual Report of the Fishery Board for 1913 states that "The majority of the fishermen were employed exclusively at herring fishing for the greater part of the year at the various centres in Scotland, England and Ireland, and enjoyed a year of exceptional prosperity. Line fishing, which is prosecuted by the older fishermen, was less successful than during the previous year".

Fishery Statistics

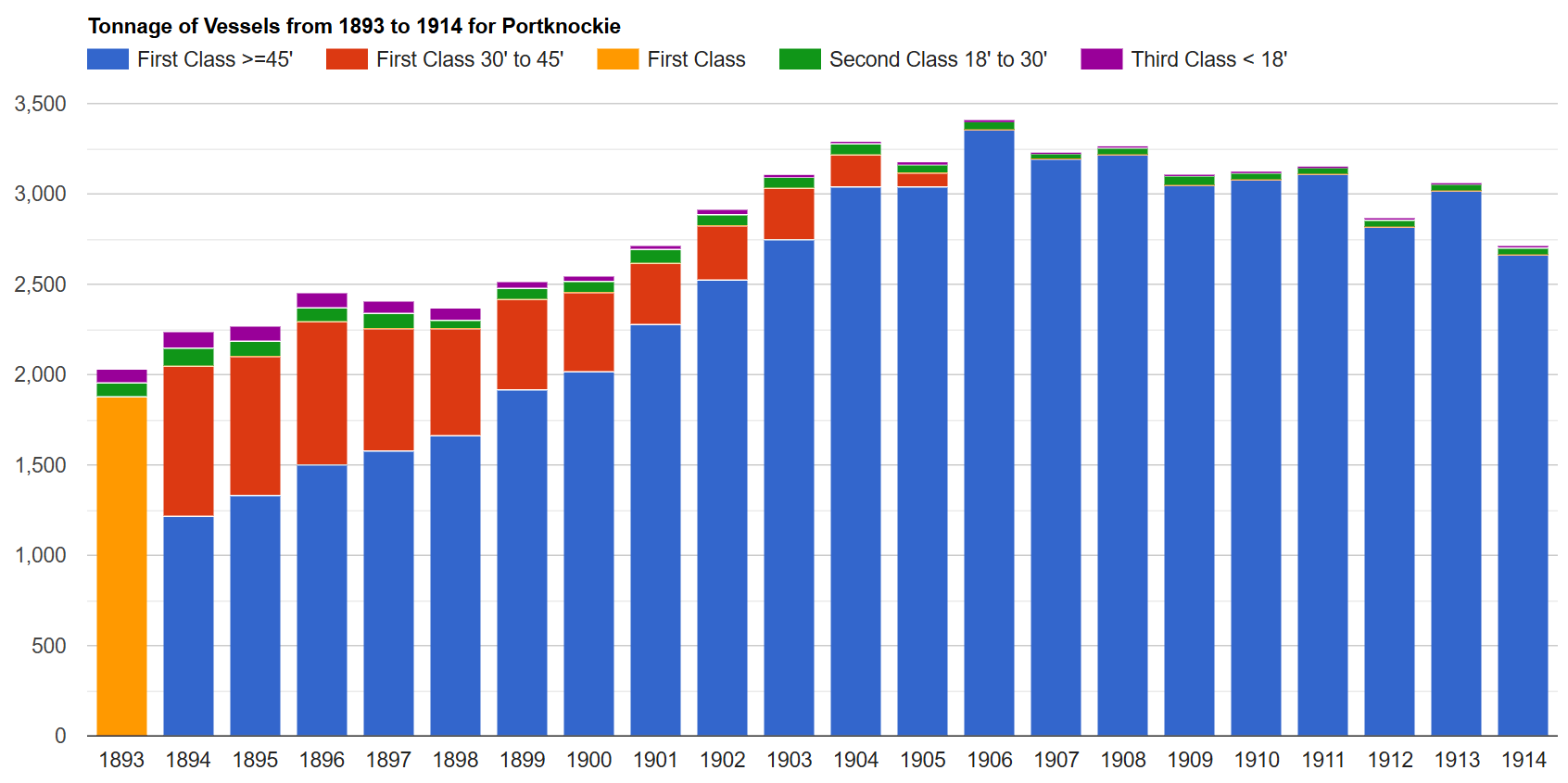
Tonnage of vessels

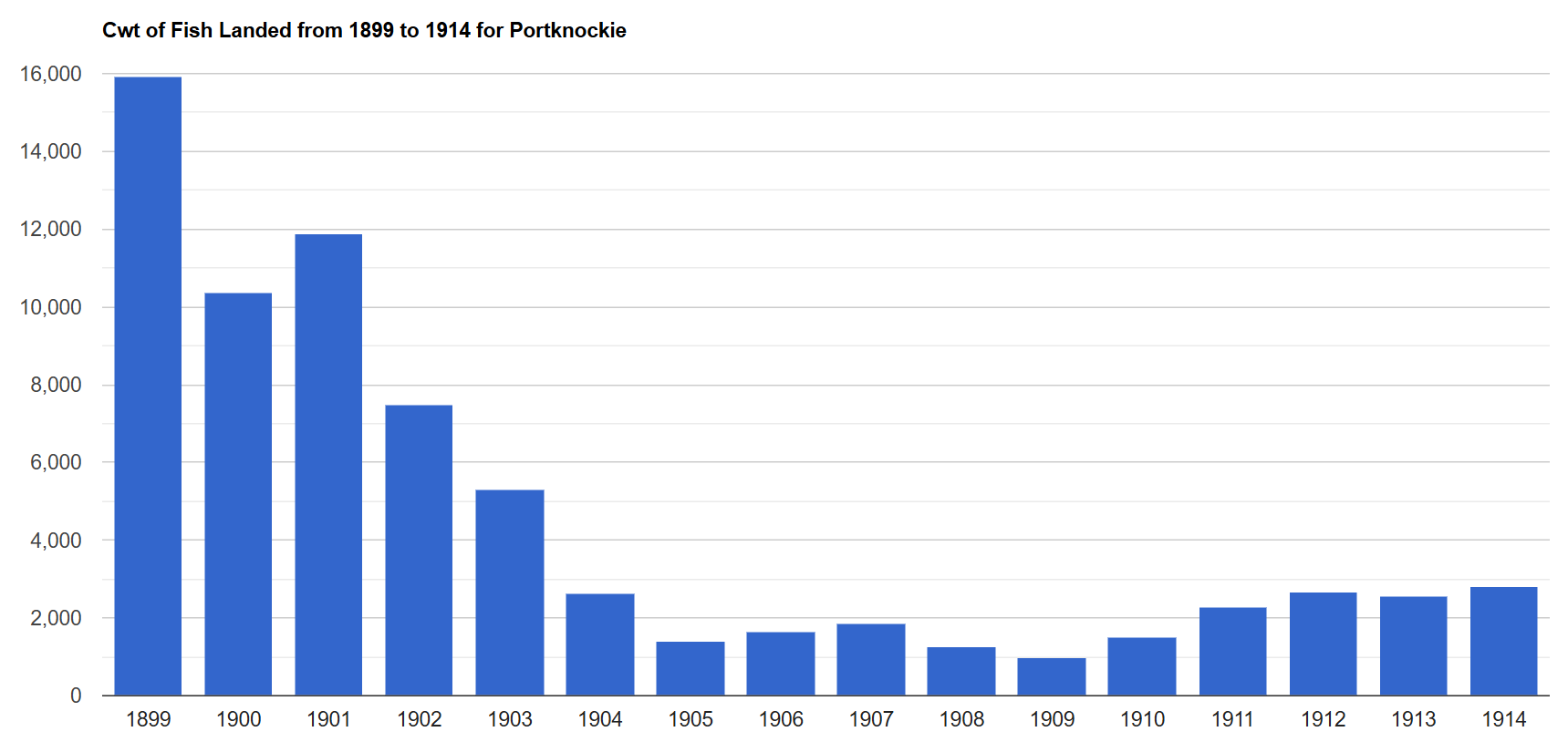
Cwt of fish landed

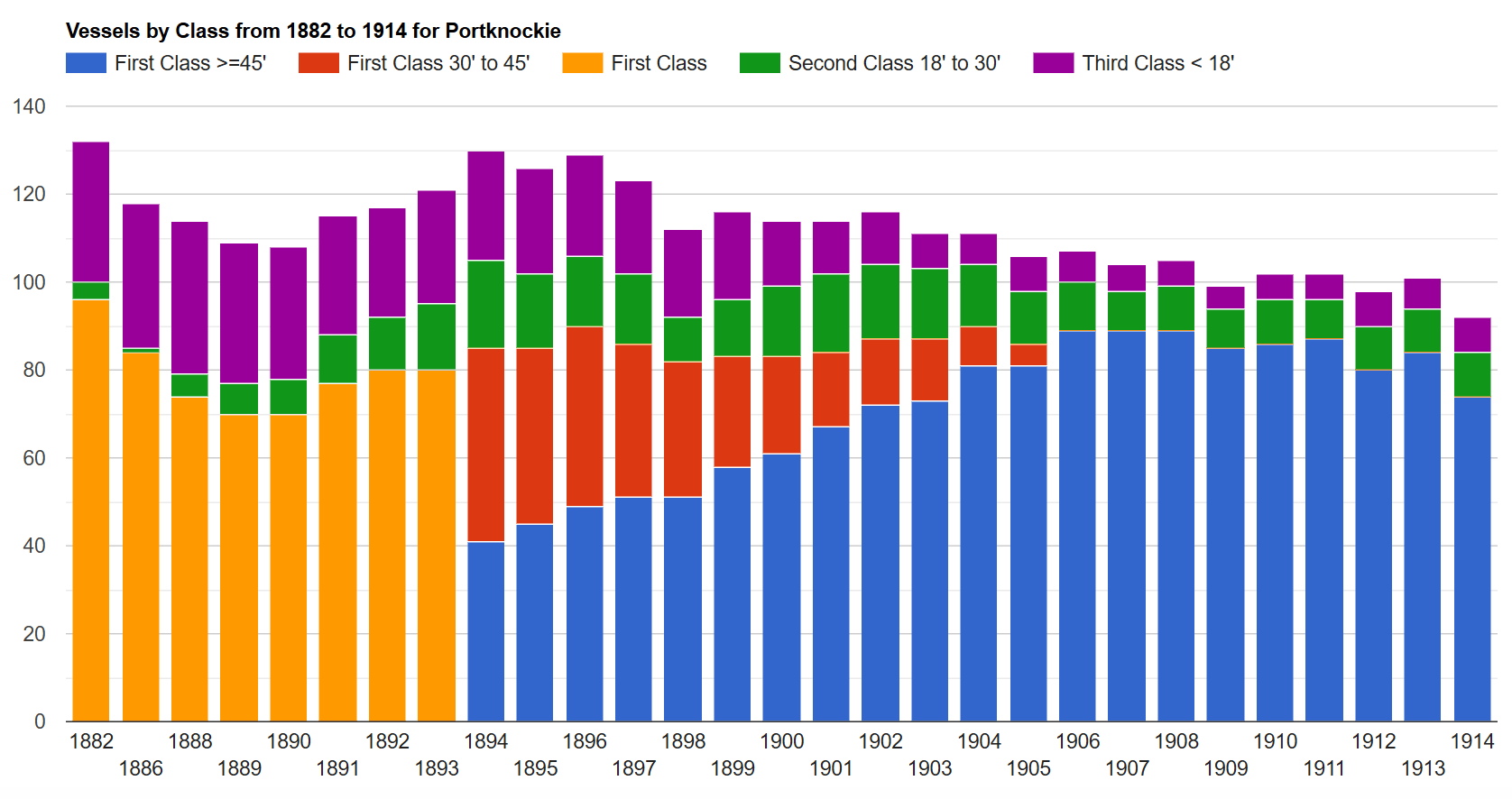
Vessels by class

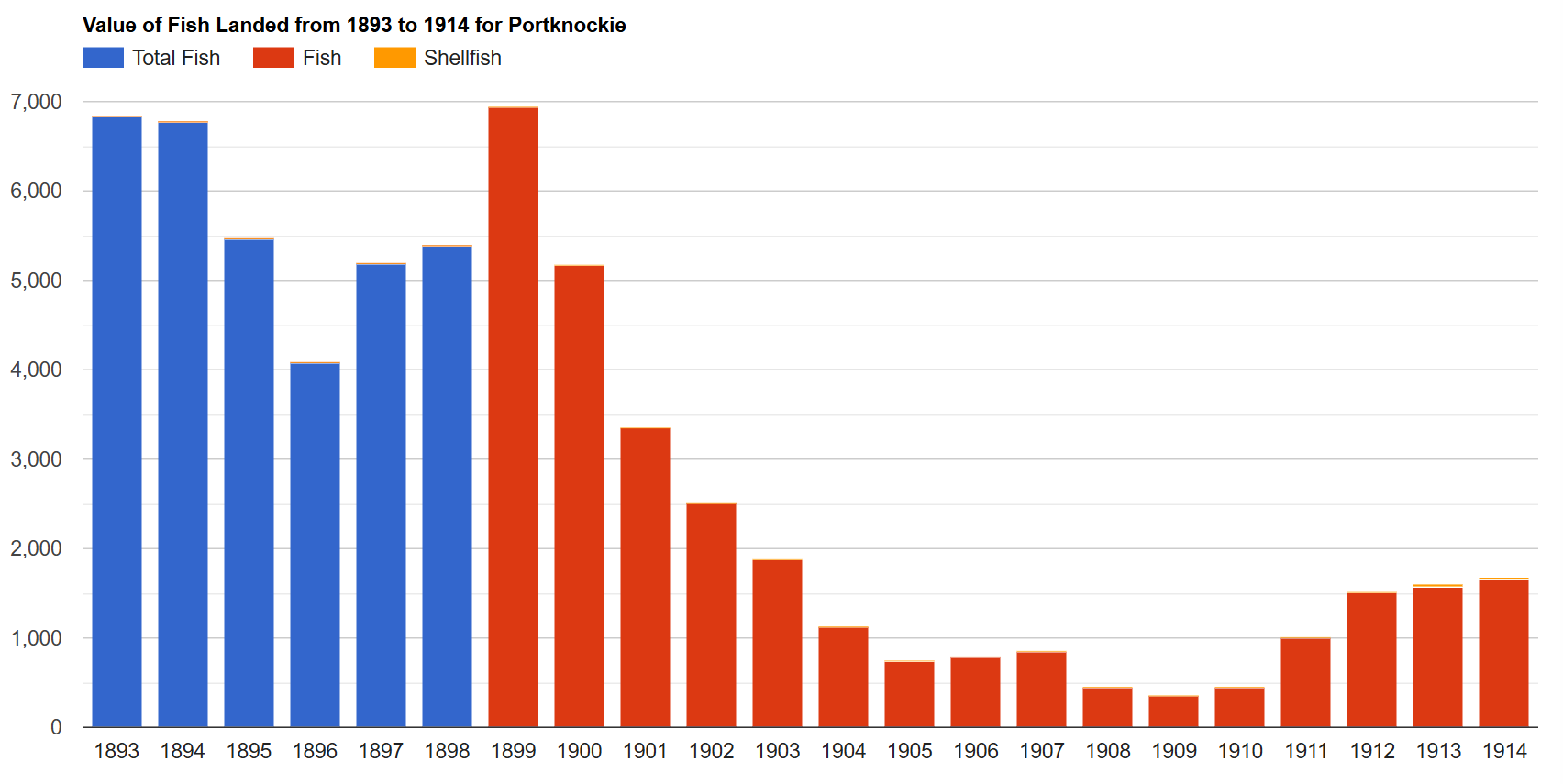
Value (£) of fish landed

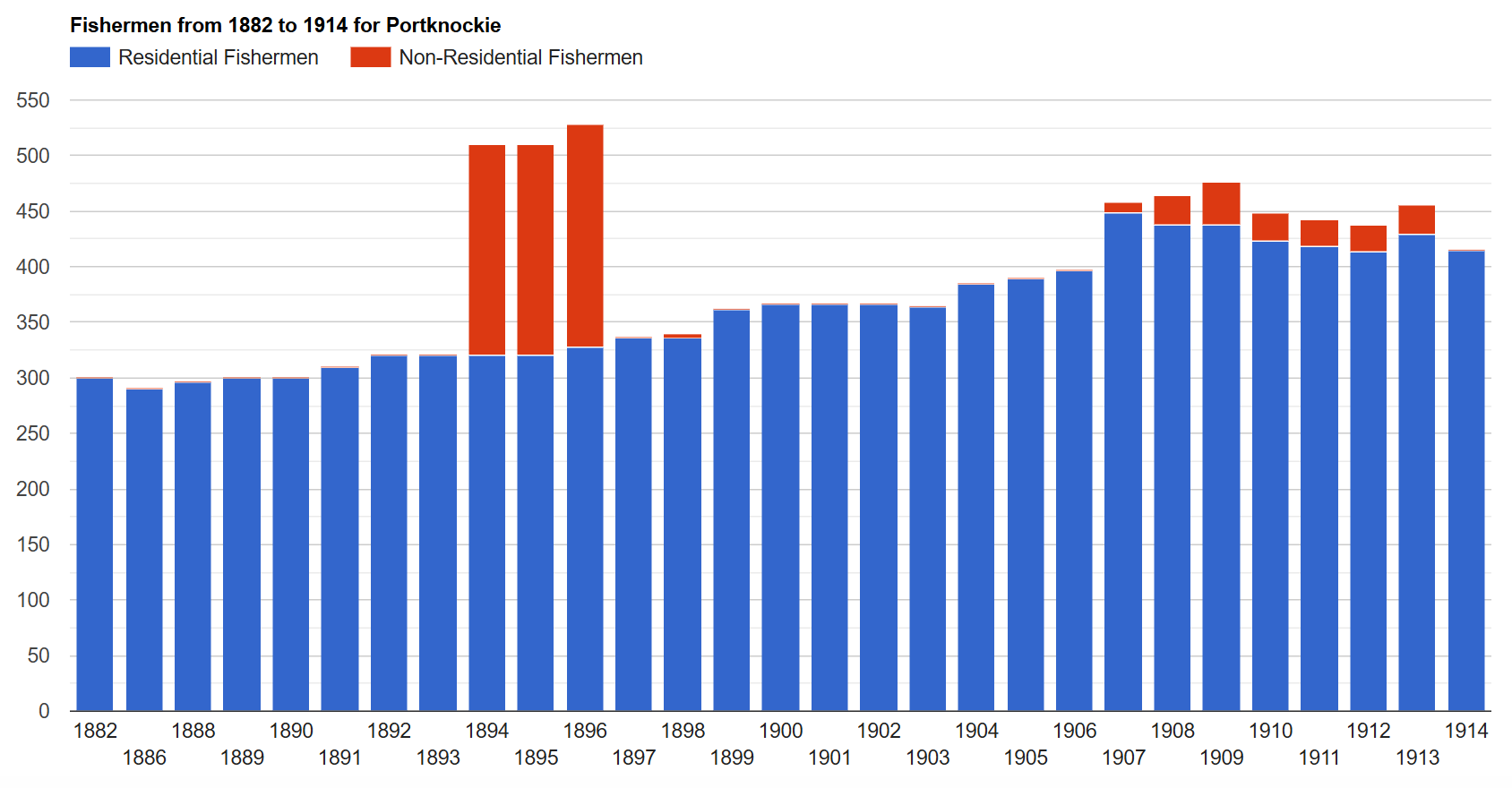
Fishermen

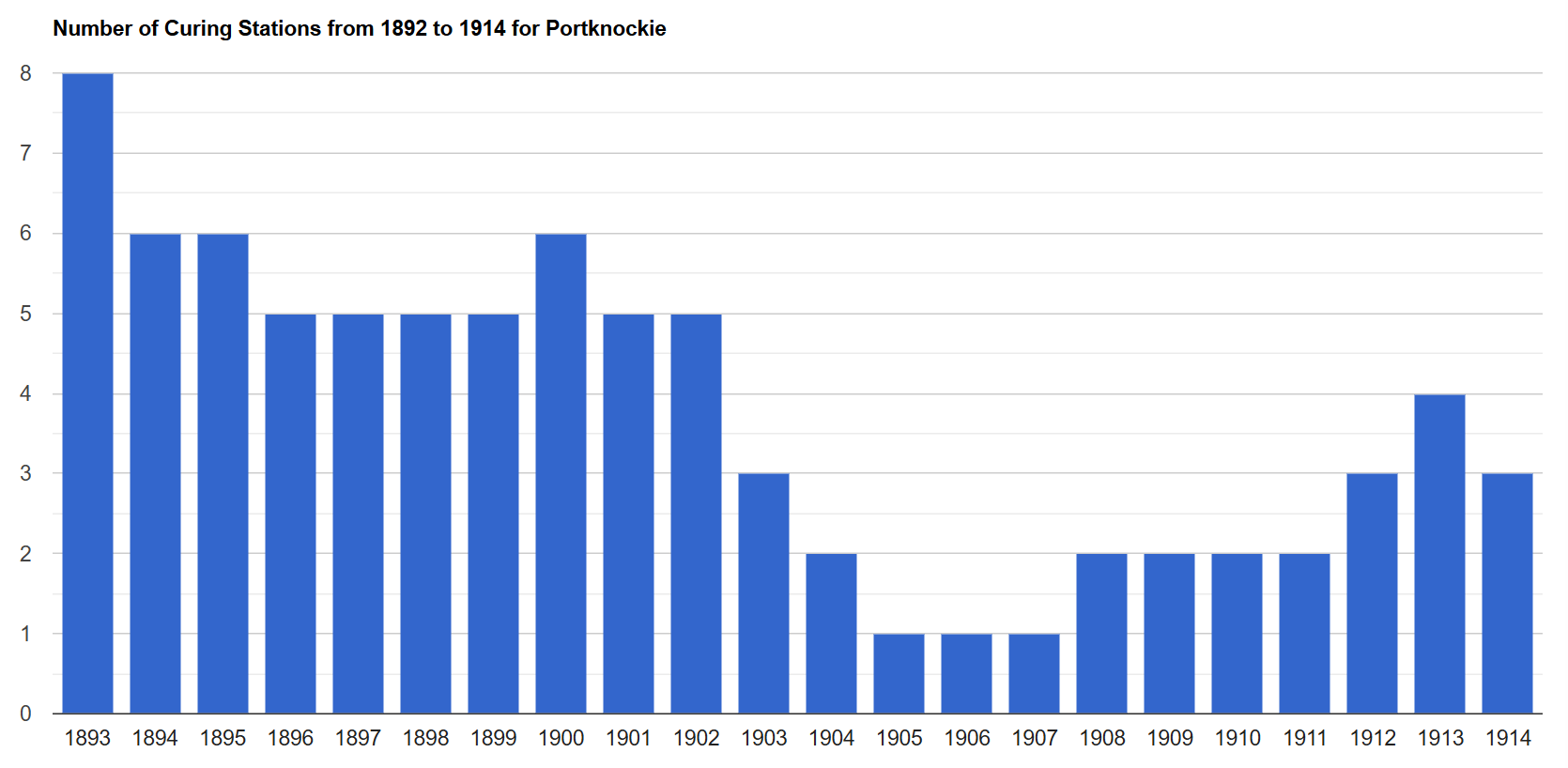
Number of curing stations
