= Rob Bell (TV presenter) =

British TV presenter (born 1979)

Rob Bell MSc
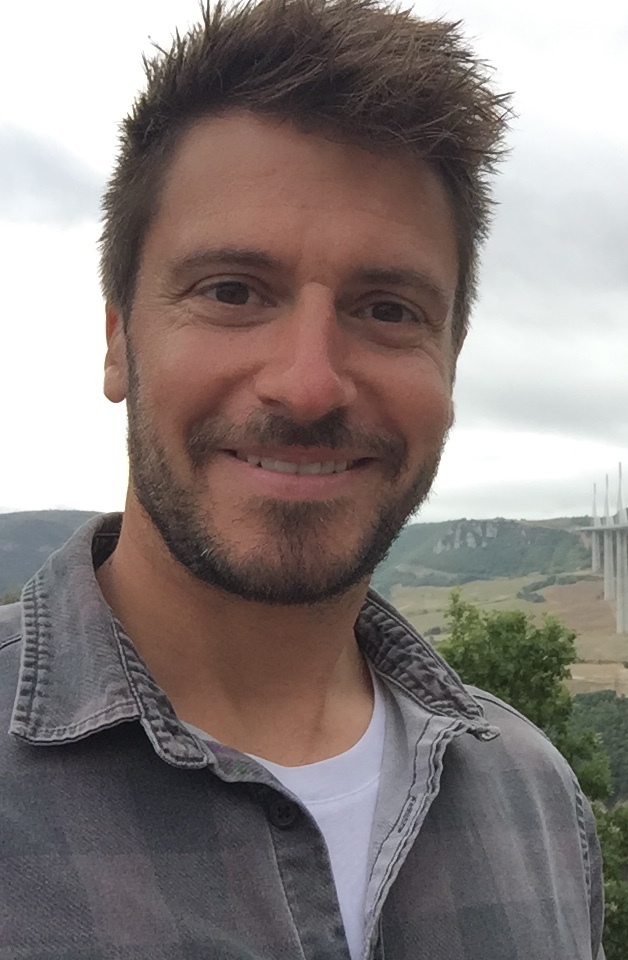
- Rob Bell by the Millau Viaduct in France
- Born: 1979 (age 46–47); Aylesbury, Buckinghamshire, England
- Education: University of Bath
- Years active: 2012–present
- Website: www.robbell.tv

Rob Bell (born 1979) is a British TV presenter and STEMnet ambassador. He has appeared on TV programmes on BBC, Channel 5, Travel Channel (now DMAX) and Yesterday.

In 2015, Bell became one of just a few people to complete seven marathons on seven continents in seven days.

== Early life ==
Born in Buckinghamshire in 1979, his father's work with General Motors took the family to the United States when Bell was six and on to the outskirts of Paris when he was nine. His mother was a big influence for what was to become a passion for engineering.

Bell achieved a Master's degree in Mechanical Engineering with French at the University of Bath, completing his dissertation at University in Lyon, France. He had previously worked for French radio station Connexion FM and the Energy Saving Trust before he started in television.

== Career ==
Bell's first television work was the BBC series Engineering Giants, which he co-hosted with engineer turned comedian Tom Wrigglesworth in 2012. In 2013 he presented the Travel Channel programme Rob Bell's Engineering Enigmas and its series Man Vs World, where he participated in several adventure sports in different locations around the world. This was followed up in 2014 by the BBC programme The Science of D-Day, and another Travel Channel programme Secrets and Mysteries London and the Channel 5 six-part series Underground Britain.

In 2015 Bell presented the BBC history programme Haslar: Secrets of a War Hospital, and then completed seven marathons on seven continents for the Travel Channel series Monster Marathon Challenge.

In 2016 Bell presented the BBC documentary Tank Men to commemorate 100 years since the first use of tanks, and narrated the BBC series Sea Cities. He also presented the Channel 5 series Britain's Greatest Bridges. He also appeared as a contributor to the Yesterday series Abandoned Engineering, which was later adapted to the 2017 US series Mysteries of the Abandoned on the Science Channel.

During 2017 he presented further Channel 5 programmes: Inside the Tube – Going Underground, Great British Royal Ships, and The World's Greatest Bridges. He co-presented The Great Fire (with Dan Jones and Suzannah Lipscomb) and Brunel:The Man who Built Britain. He also presented the BBC show Invented in The South.

In 2018 Bell presented further programmes for Channel 5 with The Flying Scotsman airing in February, World's Tallest Skyscrapers in June and Walking Britain's Lost Railways in September. A second series of Walking Britain's Lost Railways premiered in 2020.

In 2021, Bell presented the Channel 5 series London's Greatest Bridges with Rob Bell.

== Filmography ==
Year	Television series	Role	Notes	Ref
2012	Engineering Giants	Co-presenter	3 episodes	
2013	Rob Bell's Engineering Enigmas	Presenter		
2014	The Science of D-Day	Presenter	Documentary	
2014	Secrets and Mysteries of London	Presenter	Documentary	
2015	Underground Britain	Presenter	TV series	
2015	Haslar: Secrets of a War Hospital	Presenter	Documentary	
2015	Monster Marathon Challenge	Presenter	TV series	
2016	Tank Men	Presenter	Documentary	
2016	Sea Cities	Co-presenter	TV series	
2016	Britain's Greatest Bridges	Presenter	TV series	
2017–present	Abandoned Engineering	Co-presenter	TV series	
2017	Mysteries of the Abandoned	Co-presenter	TV series	
2017	Inside the Tube – Going Underground	Presenter	TV series	
2017	The World's Greatest Bridges	Presenter	TV series	
2017	The Great Fire: London Burns	Co-presenter	TV series	
2017	Brunel:The Man who Built Britain	Presenter	TV series	
2017	Invented in...	Presenter; episode "The South"	TV series	
2017–2020	Great British Royal Ships	Presenter	TV series	
2018	Sea Cities	Presenter	TV series	
2018	The Flying Scotsman	Presenter	TV series	
2018	Numb Skulls	Presenter	TV series; episode "Atlantic Crossing"	
2018	World's Tallest Skyscrapers: Beyond the Clouds	Presenter	TV series	
2018 – present	Walking Britain's Lost Railways	Presenter	TV series	
2019	Building the Channel Tunnel: 25 Years On	Narrator	TV series	
2019	London: 2000 Years of History	Presenter	TV series	
2019	The Blitz: Britain On Fire	Co-presenter	TV series	
2019	Secret Nazi Bases	Co-presenter	TV series	
2019	When Buildings Collapse: World's Worst Engineering Disasters	Presenter	Documentary	
2020	Britain's Lost Battlefields with Rob Bell	Presenter	TV series	
2020	On Board Britain's Nuclear Submarine: Trident	Presenter	Documentary	
2021	London's Greatest Bridges with Rob Bell	Presenter	TV series	
2021	The Buildings That Fought Hitler	Presenter	TV series	
2021 – present	Building the Impossible	Presenter	TV series	
2021	Britain's Top 10 Ships	Presenter	Documentary	
2021	The Stonehenge Enigma: What Lies Beneath?	Presenter	Documentary	
2021	When Big Things Go Wrong	Contributor	TV series	
2022	Rob Bell's Engineering Reborn	Presenter	TV series	
2022	British Planes That Won the War with Rob Bell	Presenter	TV series	
2023	Britannia: Secrets of the Royal Yacht	Presenter	Documentary	
2024	Inside Nuclear – Heysham 2	Presenter	Documentary	

== Honours and awards ==
Rob Bell was awarded an Honorary Doctorate of Engineering (DEng) by the University of Bath in January 2025. The award recognised Bell's work in promoting the work of those in the engineering fields: 'a true champion for the engineering field and a great communicator for its benefits'.
